= Hospital de San Pedro, Antigua Guatemala =

St. Peter Hospital
- Hospital de San Pedro; Hospital del Hermano Pedro (Spanish)
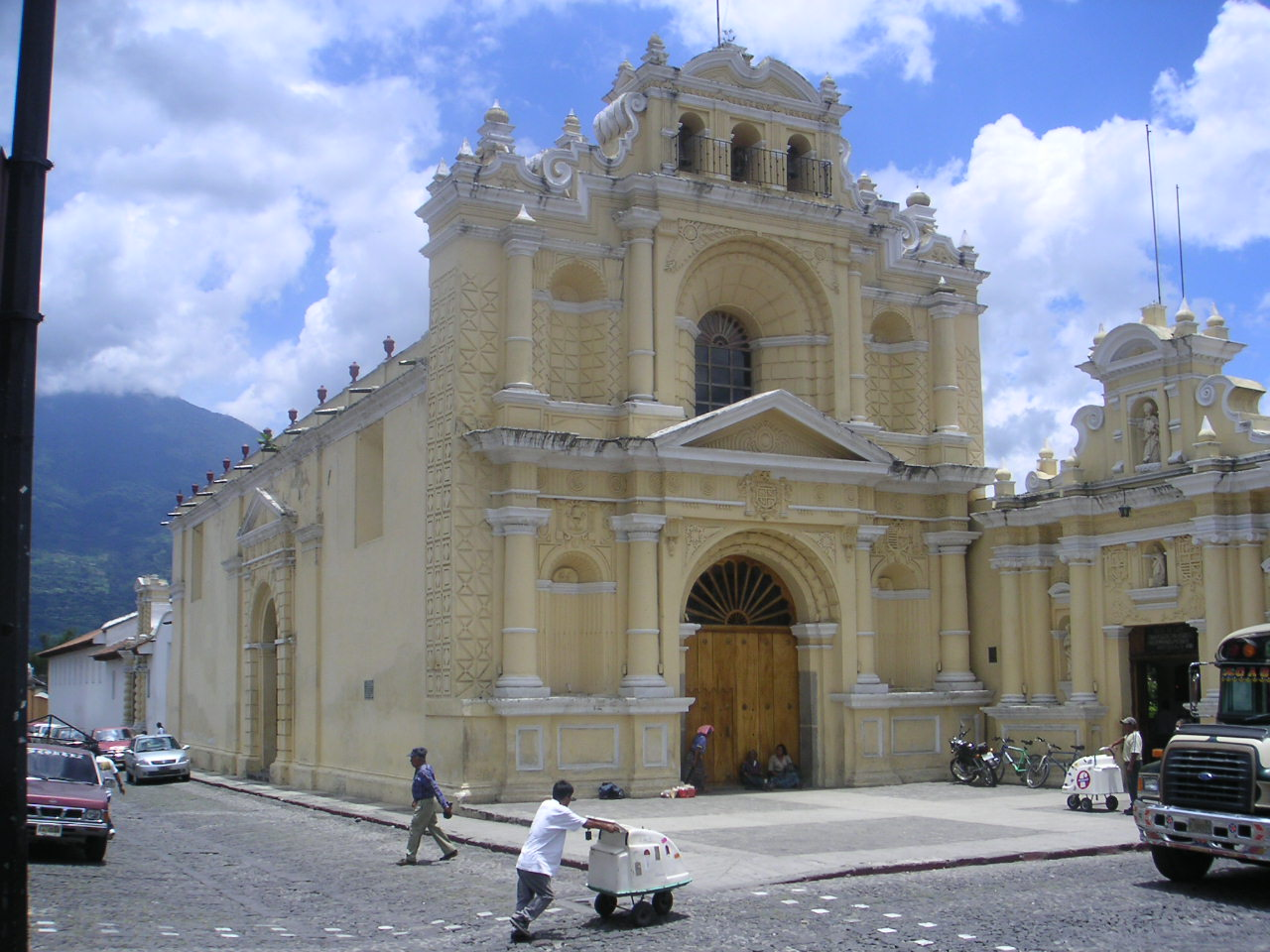

- Location in Guatemala

General information
- Status: Active church
- Architectural style: Spanish seismic baroque
- Location: Antigua Guatemala, Guatemala
- Coordinates: 14°33′38″N 90°44′28″W
- Owner: Franciscans

San Pedro is a hospital and adjacent church in Antigua Guatemala, Guatemala. It is dedicated to Peter of Saint Joseph Betancur.

== History ==
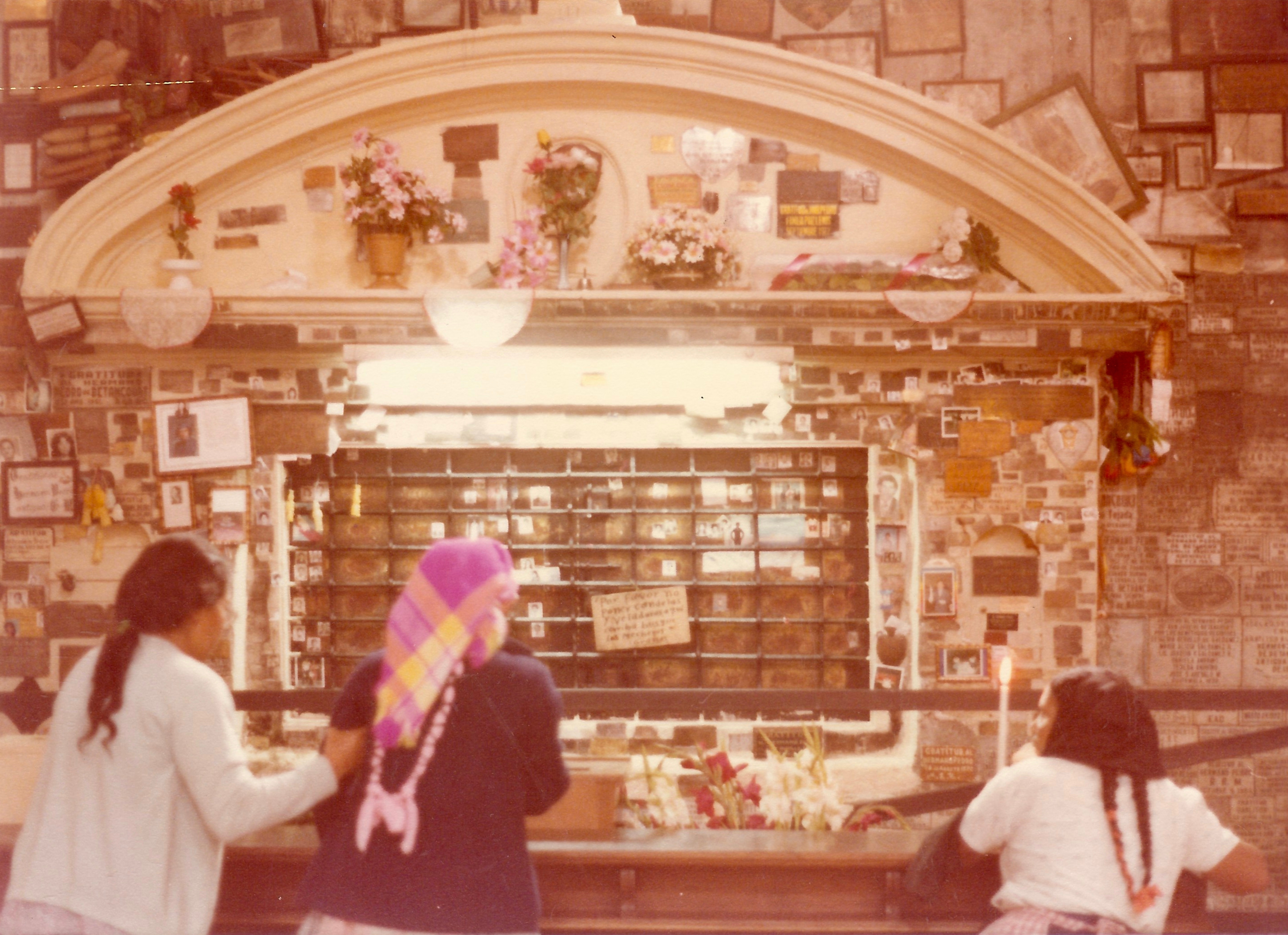
Worshippers at the crypt of Hermano Pedro at San Francisco Church.

The hospital was founded in 1663 by Dominican friars. During the nineteenth century it started being managed by Capuchin nuns, who made some improvements to the building. In 1869, the Charity Sisters of San Vicente de Paul took charge of the building.

The hospital is rich in history. The first hospital in Antigua was founded by Hermano Pedro Betancourt, a Franciscan priest in the early 1600s in a small thatched hut near the present site of the Belen Convent. Brother Pedro became known for physically picking the sick and abandoned up in the streets and carrying them to his hospital in his arms or on his back. He often roamed the streets ringing a bell asking for donations to feed and clothe those in his care. He wore the rags and tattered clothing of those that he served. The selfless Franciscan is beloved by all Guatemalans. Over the next three hundred years the hospital was destroyed by earthquakes and rebuilt many times. In 1984, the Franciscan priest Guillermo Bonilla, felt called to follow in Hermano Pedro's footsteps in ministering to the poor, sick and outcasts of society. He rented small homes to house the abandoned elderly and orphaned children and appealed to the citizens of Guatemala for help. Eventually he began rebuilding the ruins of the hospital destroyed by the 1974 earthquake and the present day hospital facility continues in the Franciscan tradition of taking in those who need help and care. The hospital receives no government support and relies solely on donations. It is operated by the Franciscan order of the Catholic Church and is directed by Padre Jose Contran.

Hermano Pedro's tomb, now a shrine, is in the transept of San Francisco Church three blocks from the present hospital on 2nd Avenida and 7th Calle.

== Current use ==
The building today serves as a social center for the needy, shelter for old people, treatment of malnourished children, handicapped and blind or mentally diseased people. It is managed by Franciscan friars. It is a place unlike any other - a multi-service facility providing a home, and care for the elderly and orphaned, the mentally challenged and chronically ill. Over three hundred people ranging in age from a few days to over ninety live at Obras Sociales Hermano Pedro permanently. In addition, Obras Sociales Hermano Pedro offers a school for the handicapped children and a nutrition center where malnourished infants and children are treated. Services are offered to the public through a medical and dental clinic, a small basic clinical lab, a pharmacy and a physical therapy department. Used clothing is also sold at minimal cost to the poor while also providing a little extra income for the hospital.

The hospital also houses several functional operating rooms. The rooms are filled on a weekly basis for all but one month of the year by medical groups that come to perform a variety of surgeries for nominal costs, or often for free. Visiting staff (surgeons and nurses, often from the United States) are assisted by full-time nurses employed by the hospital.

== See also ==
- 1773 Guatemala earthquake
