= Iglesia y Convento de las Capuchinas, Antigua Guatemala =

Convent of the Capuchins
- Iglesia y convento de las Capuchinas; Convento e Iglesia de Nuestra Señora del Pilar de Zaragoza (Spanish)
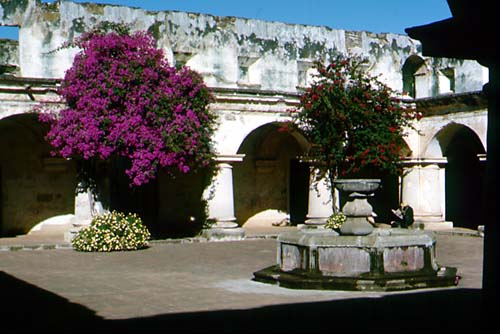
- Capuchinas monastery

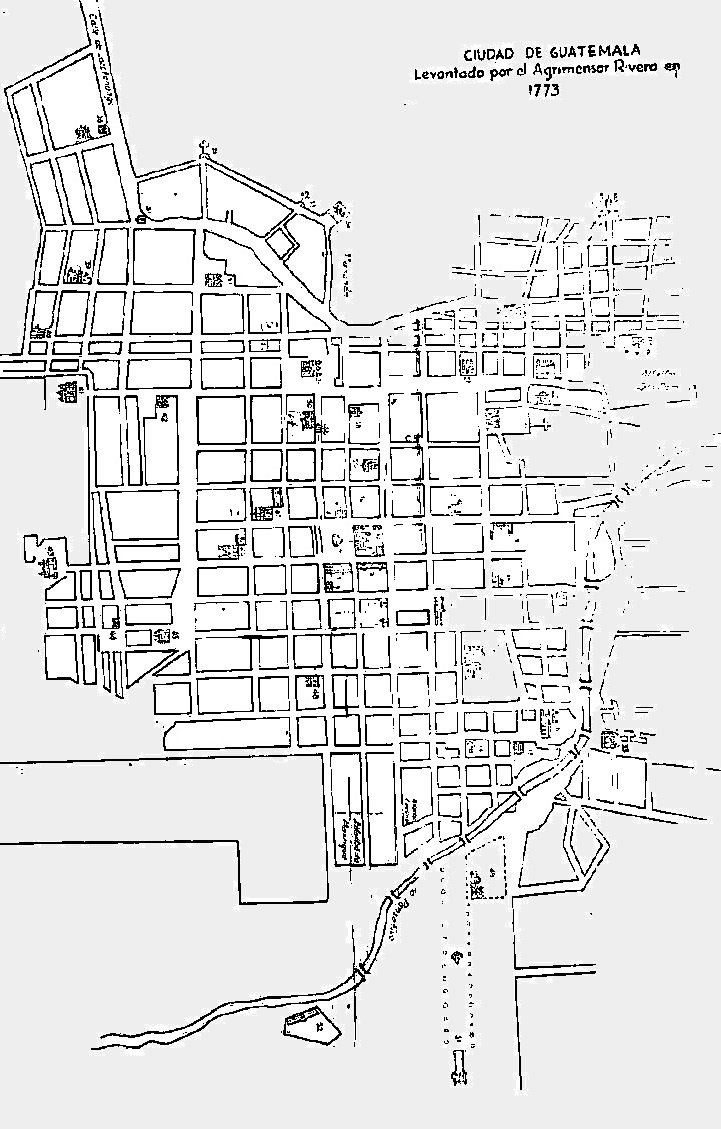
- Location within Antigua Guatemala

General information
- Status: Paid access
- Architectural style: Spanish seismic baroque
- Location: Antigua Guatemala, Guatemala
- Coordinates: 14°33′35″N 90°43′53″W
- Construction started: 1731
- Completed: 1736
- Destroyed: 1751 earthquake; Santa Marta earthquake in 1773; 1917 Guatemala earthquake; 1976 Guatemala earthquake
- Owner: Consejo Nacional Para la Protección de La Antigua Guatemala

Design and construction
- Architect: Diego de Porres

The Iglesia y Convento de las Capuchinas is a notable convent and church in Antigua Guatemala, Guatemala. It is one of the finest examples of an 18th-century convent in Guatemala. It was consecrated in 1736 but like the rest of the city suffered damage during the 1751 and 1773 earthquakes respectively, and was abandoned by order of the Captain General at the time.

== History ==
The building complex, originally called "Convento e Iglesia de Nuestra Señora del Pilar de Zaragoza" -Convent and Church of Our Lady of Zaragoza-, was approved by king Felipe V in 1725 just when the Order of Capuchins arrived to Santiago de los Caballeros. Construction started on 1731 and was blessed on 1736 under Diego de Porres supervision; in fact, it was the last convent to be built in the city, and the first one that stopped asking for a donation to the new nuns, allowing then poor ladies to embrace religious life.

Daily routine for the nuns was ruled by strict regulations which include for some the maximum discipline on poverty, penance and fasting; also, they should survive on the tithing only; nevertheless, since the arrival of this convent there were two kinds of nuns in Santiago de los Caballeros: discalced and urban.

| Attribute | Discalced nuns | Urban nuns |
|---|---|---|
| Designation | Community life | Private life |
| Admission cost | None | Donation in goods or property to produce revenues for the congregation |
| Lifestyle | Enclosed | Enclosed |
| Prayer | In the chorus | In the chorus |
| Austerity rules | Strict: depended on tithing, silent at all times, except to pray and never drank chocolate. (Note: Chocolate was the drink of choice in Guatemala during the colonial era. It was considered a liquid food.) | Relaxed: could have external income and were allowed to drink chocolate, except during fasting. |
| Rooms | Common life in recreation rooms of work. They had a tiny "celda" which they only use to sleep. | No common life at all. They lived in a large cell that was practically a small house. |
| Food | They ate together in silence in dining halls. They could not eat meat. | They prepared their own food. They were allowed to eat meat unless they were fasting. |
| Help | They had to perform all the monastery chores, or work in community service for the congregation. | They could have personal servants and slaves. |
| Clothing | Austere rustic clothes fibers. | Fine clothes; often wore jewelry. |
| Footwear | Simple sandals | Shoes or slippers. |
| Special attributes | None | Tutors of girls entrusted to the convent. |

In 1920, prince Wilhelm of Sweden visited Antigua Guatemala and mentioned that the old Capuchin monastery with its many underground passages from the monks' cells to those of the nuns was worth a visit, especially one part where the cells were built in a circle surrounding a central common chamber.

== Image Gallery ==
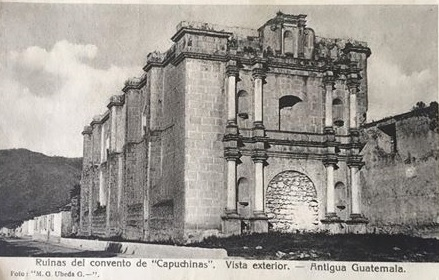
Church of the Capuchins towards the end of the 19th century.

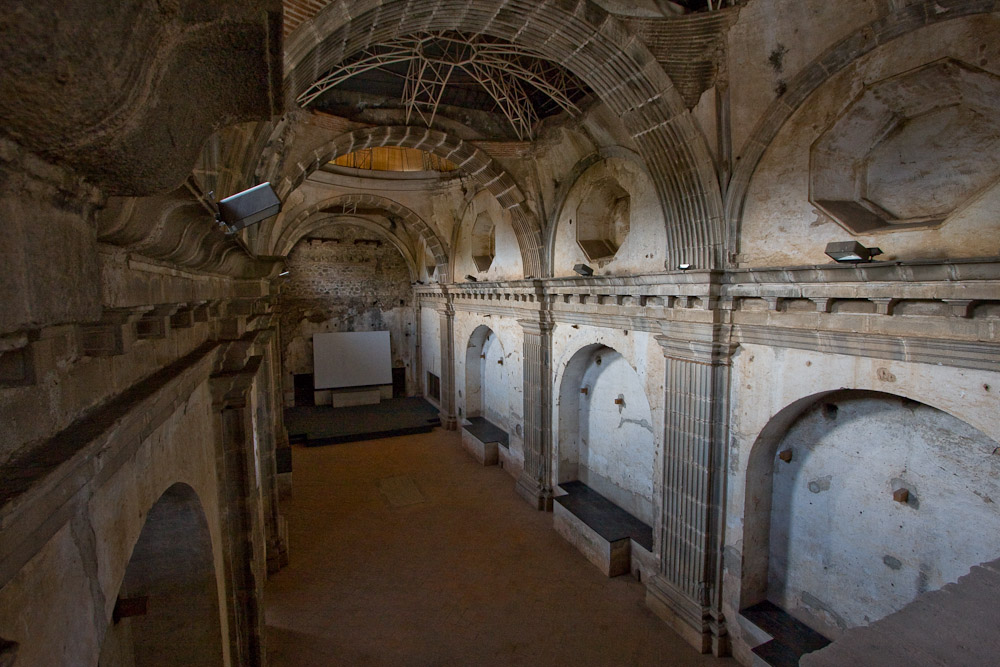
Inside the church in 2000

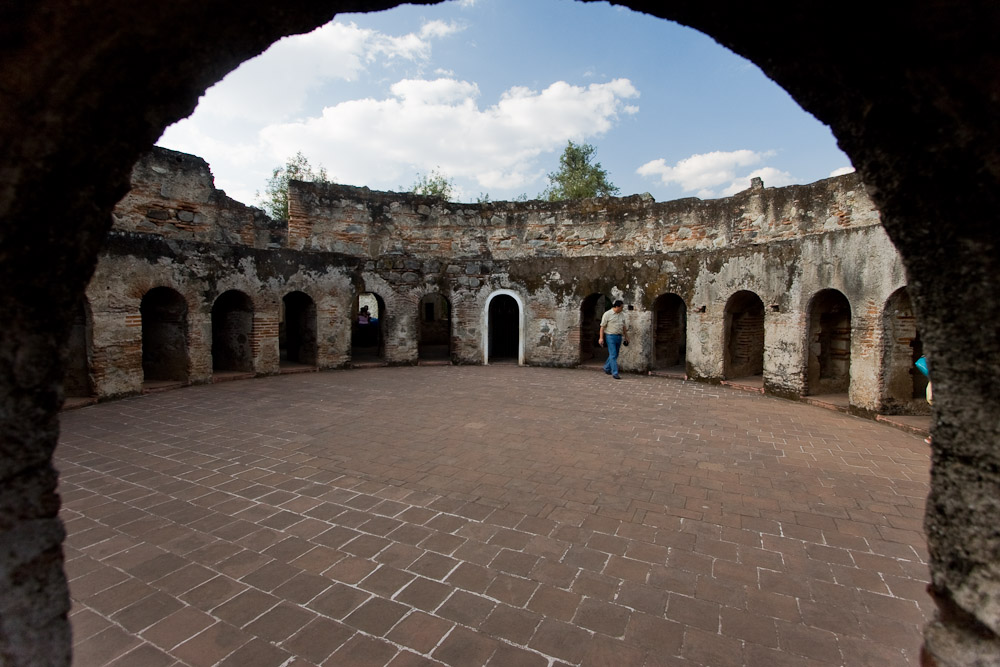
Nun cells/tower of solitude

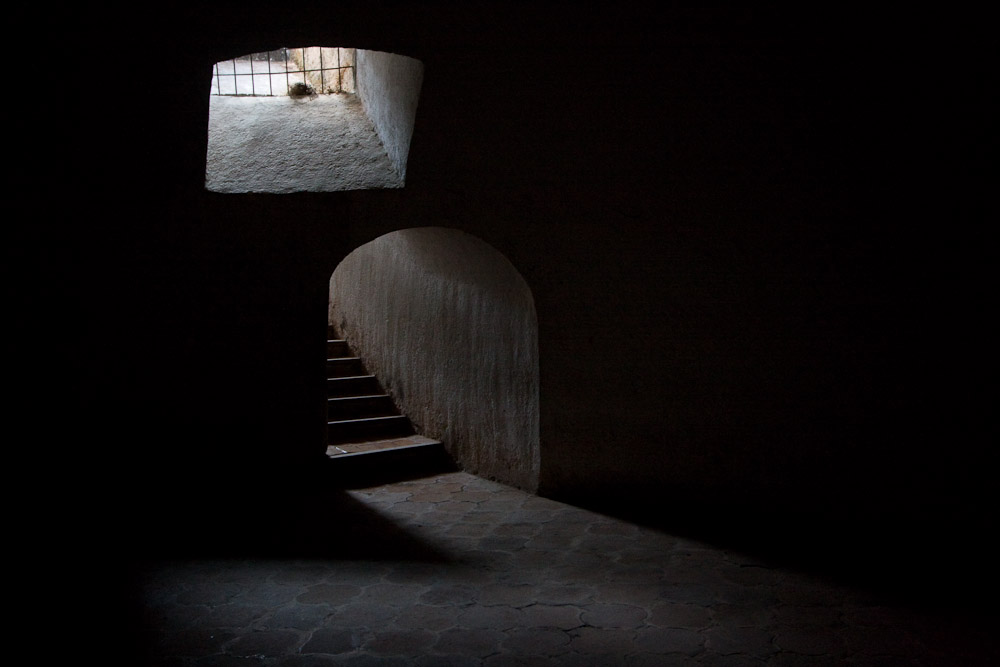
Pantry

== See also ==
- 1773 Guatemala earthquake

== Notes and references ==
=== Bibliography ===
- Anchisi de Rodríguez, Coralia (13 February 2014). "Sor Juana de Maldonado; reescribiendo su historia". Museo Ixchel, Universidad Francisco Marroquín (in Spanish). Guatemala. Archived from the original on 23 December 2014.
- Morales, Bernardo (1999). "Iglesia y Convento Las Capuchinas". Antigua Guatemala online (in Spanish). Archived from the original on 16 February 2004.
- Catholic in Spanish (n.d.). "Clarisas y Terciarias Capuchinas". Catholic in Spanish (in Spanish). Madrid, Spain. Archived from the original on 26 December 2004.
- Municipalidad de Antigua Guatemala (2008). "Iglesias y ruinas de Antigua Guatemala". Munideantigua (in Spanish). Archived from the original on 26 May 2010.
- Prins Wilhelm (1922). Between two continents, notes from a journey in Central America, 1920. London, UK: E. Nash and Grayson, Ltd. pp. 148–209.
