= Guatemala Post Office Building =

Building in Guatemala City

Coordinates: 14.637°N 90.513°W

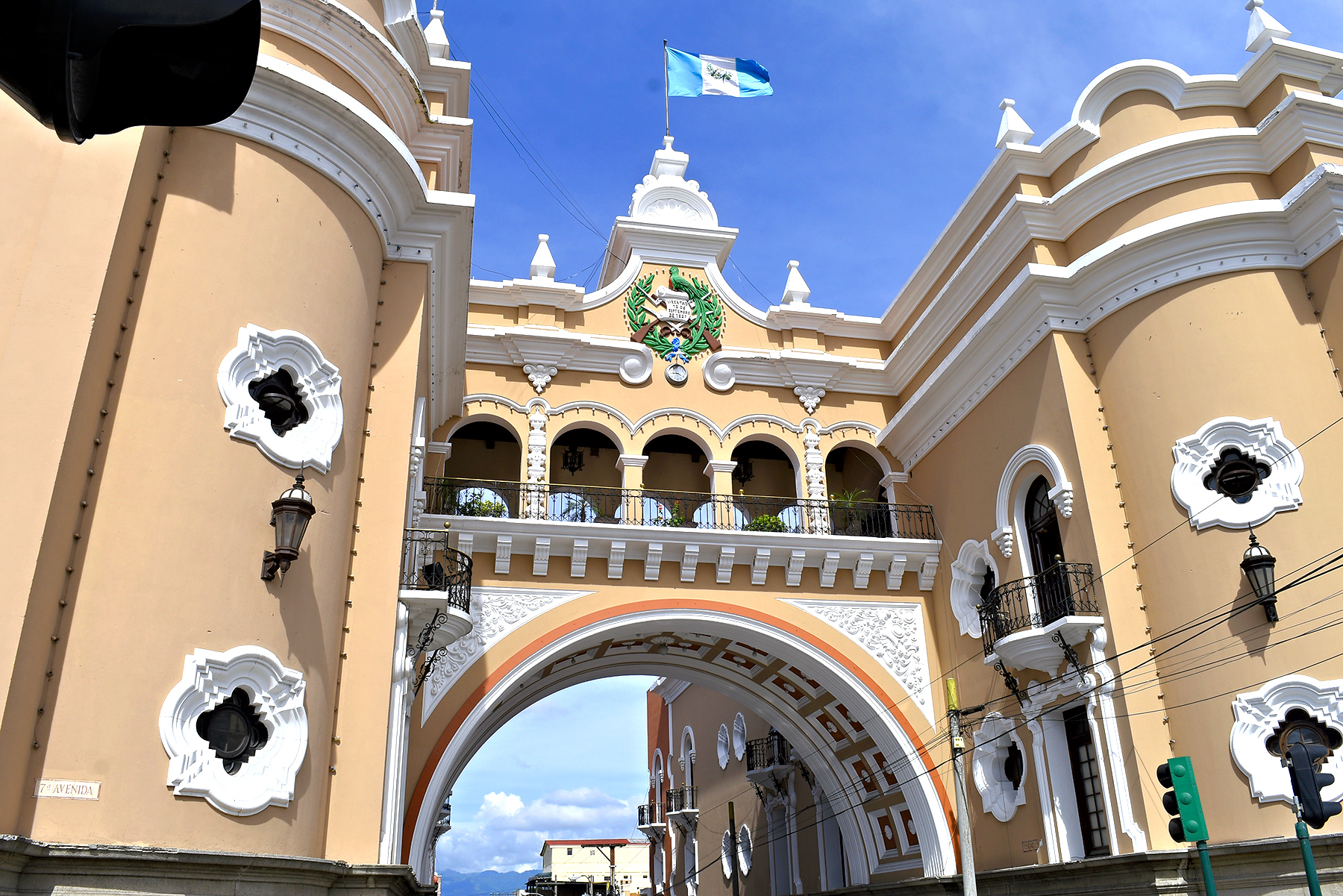
The National Post Office Building in Guatemala City.

The Guatemala Post Office Building is a building in Guatemala City, Guatemala. It is the management centre of postal services in Guatemala. It was constructed between 1937 and 1940.

The characteristic archway of the building was inspired by the Santa Catalina Arch in Antigua Guatemala.
