= Valley of Guatemala =

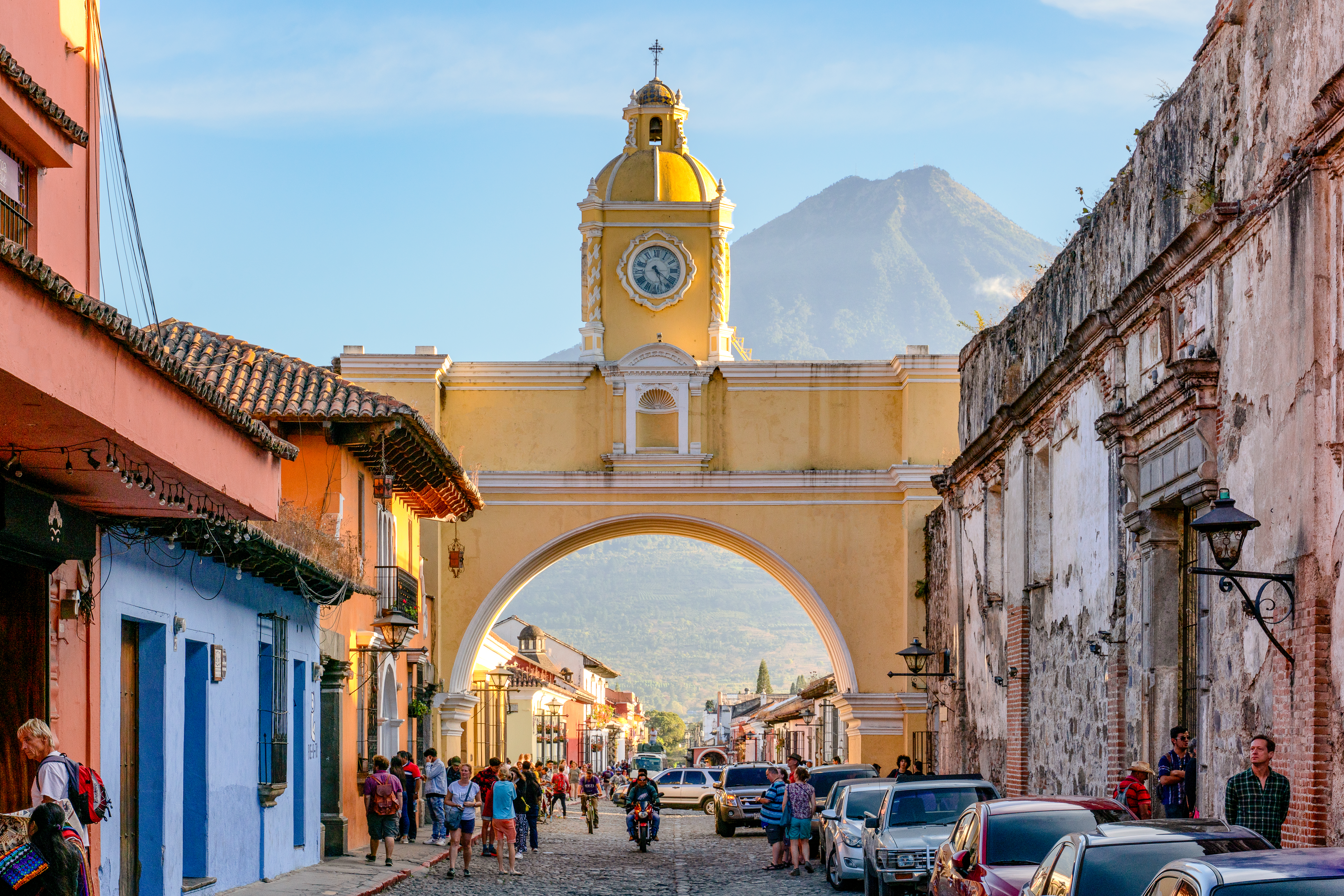
A view of the city Antigua Guatemala, in the Valley of Guatemala, with the Volcan Agua in the background.

The Valley of Guatemala is the territory in the country of Guatemala surrounding the historic city of Antigua Guatemala, the old capital of the Kingdom of Guatemala.

This territory contained the city of Santiago de los Caballeros, 2 large towns and 73 villages. In the immediate surrounding area, three of the most notable Guatemalan volcanos are present, namely: Acatenango, Agua (water), and Fuego (fire).
