= 1717 Guatemala earthquake =

1717 earthquake centered in southwestern colonial Guatemala

- Location within Central America
- Local date: September 29, 1717
- Magnitude: ~7.4 M_{w}
- Epicenter: 14.57°N 90.73°W
- Areas affected: Guatemala
- Max. intensity: MMI IX (Violent)

The 1717 Guatemala earthquake struck colonial Guatemala on September 29 with an estimated moment magnitude of 7.4, and a Mercalli intensity of approximately IX (Violent). The earthquake essentially destroyed much of the architecture of Antigua Guatemala, which was the colonial capital of Central America at the time. Over 3,000 buildings were ruined including many temples and churches. Such was the effect of the disaster that the authorities considered moving the headquarters to a settlement which was less prone to natural disasters.

Later earthquakes meant that after the 1773 earthquake the town had been moved three times. In 1776, after the Santa Marta earthquakes, the Spanish Crown finally ordered the capital to be moved to a safer location, in Spanish: Valle de la Ermita (Valley of the Shrine), where Guatemala City, the modern capital of Guatemala, now stands.

== See also ==
- List of earthquakes in Guatemala
- List of historical earthquakes
