= Arco de Santa Catalina =

Monument in Antigua Guatemala

Santa Catalina Arch
- Arco de Santa Catalina (Spanish)
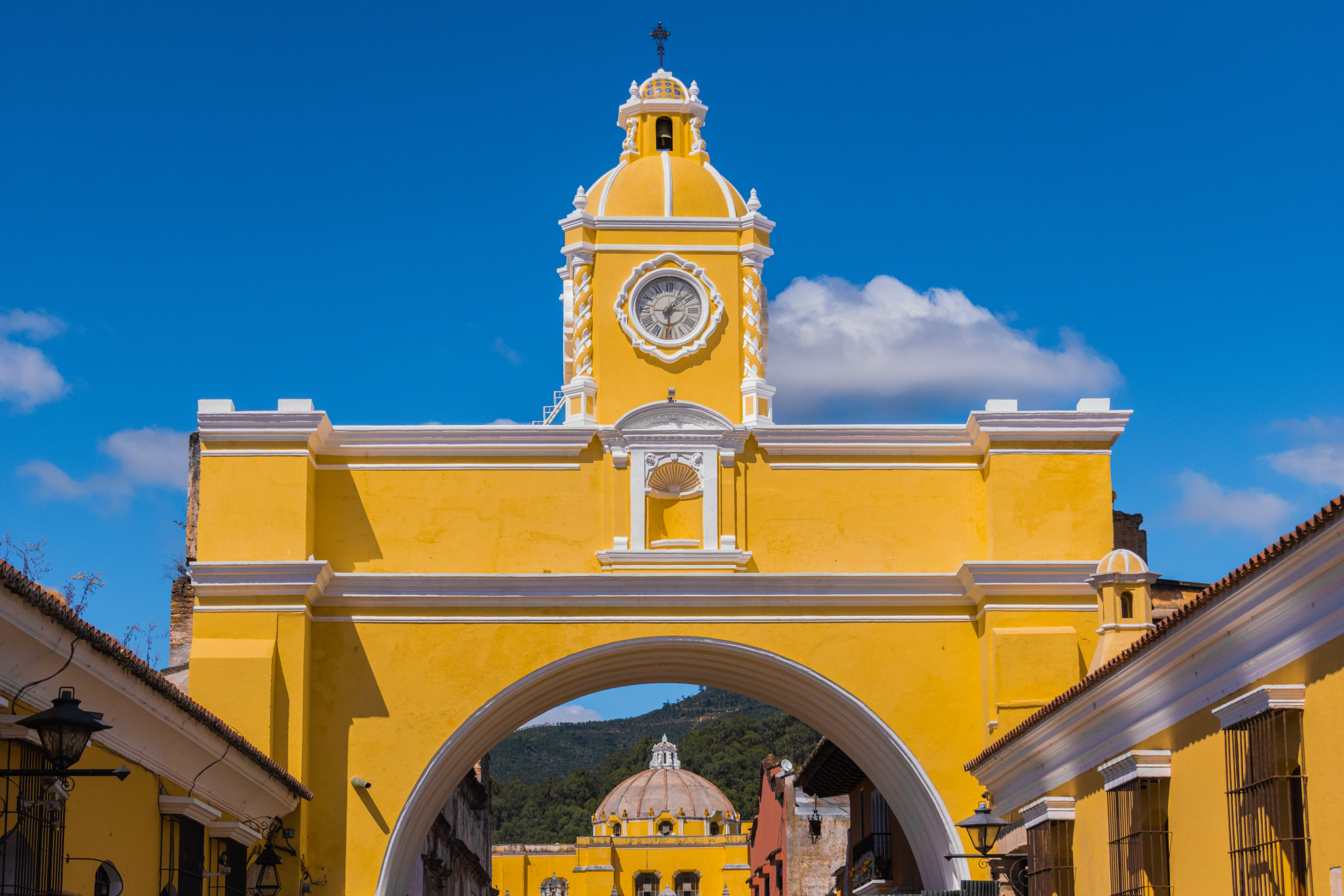
- Santa Catalina Arch in 2017

- Location within Guatemala
- Interactive map of Santa Catalina Arch
- 14°33′34″N 90°44′03″W
- Location: Antigua Guatemala, Guatemala

History
- Inaugurated by: Convent of Santa Catalina
- Built: 1693

Site notes
- Architectural style: Baroque
- Restored: 2017

UNESCO World Heritage Site
- Designated: 1979 (3rd session) (Part of Antigua Guatemala)

The Santa Catalina Arch is one of the distinguishable landmarks in Antigua Guatemala, Guatemala, located on 5th Avenue North. Built in the 17th century, it originally connected the Santa Catalina convent to a school, allowing the cloistered nuns to pass from one building to the other without going out on the street. A clock on top was added in the era of the Central American Federation, in the 1830s. The Guatemala Post Office Building in Guatemala City is based upon the arch.
