= Antigua Guatemala =

- City
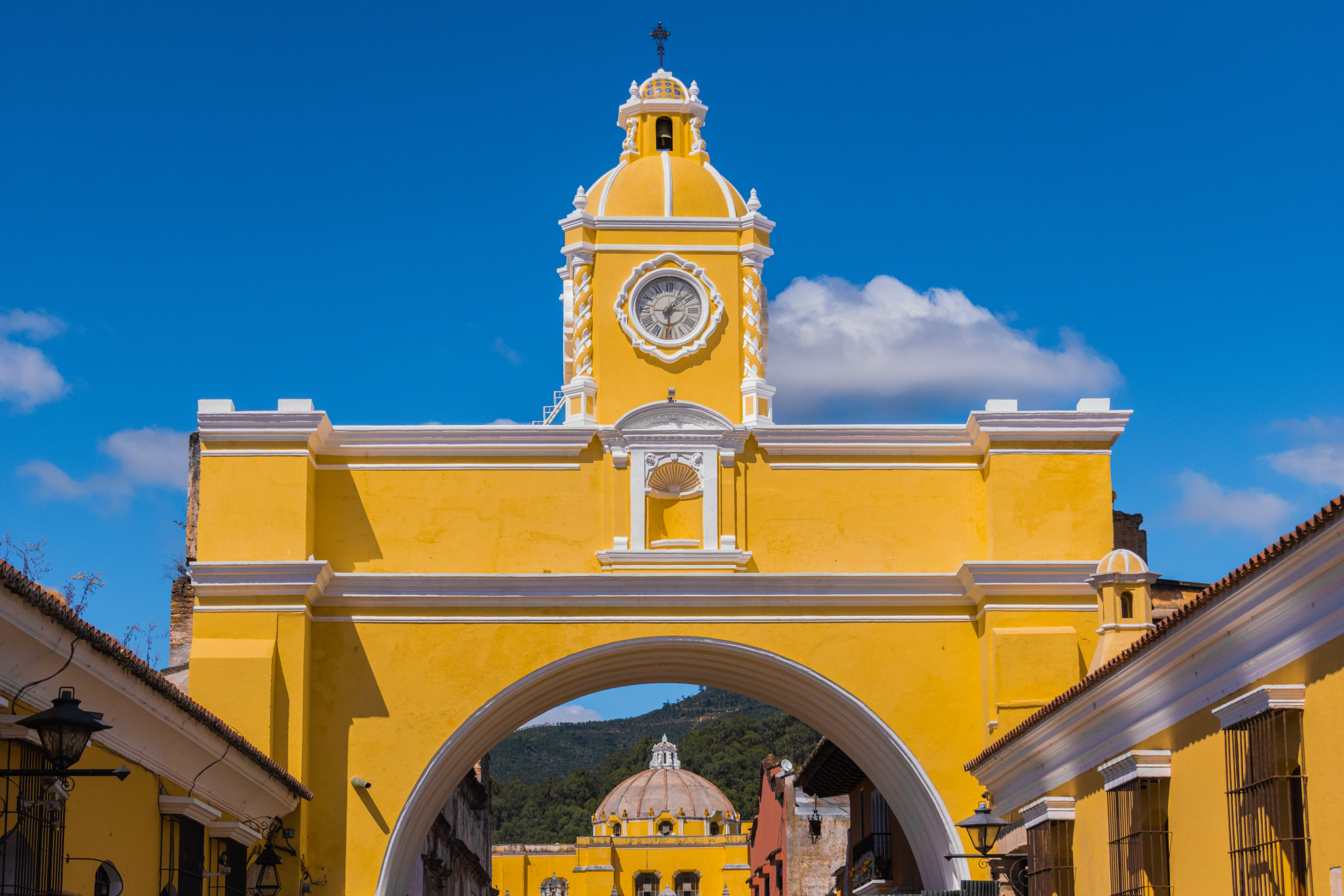
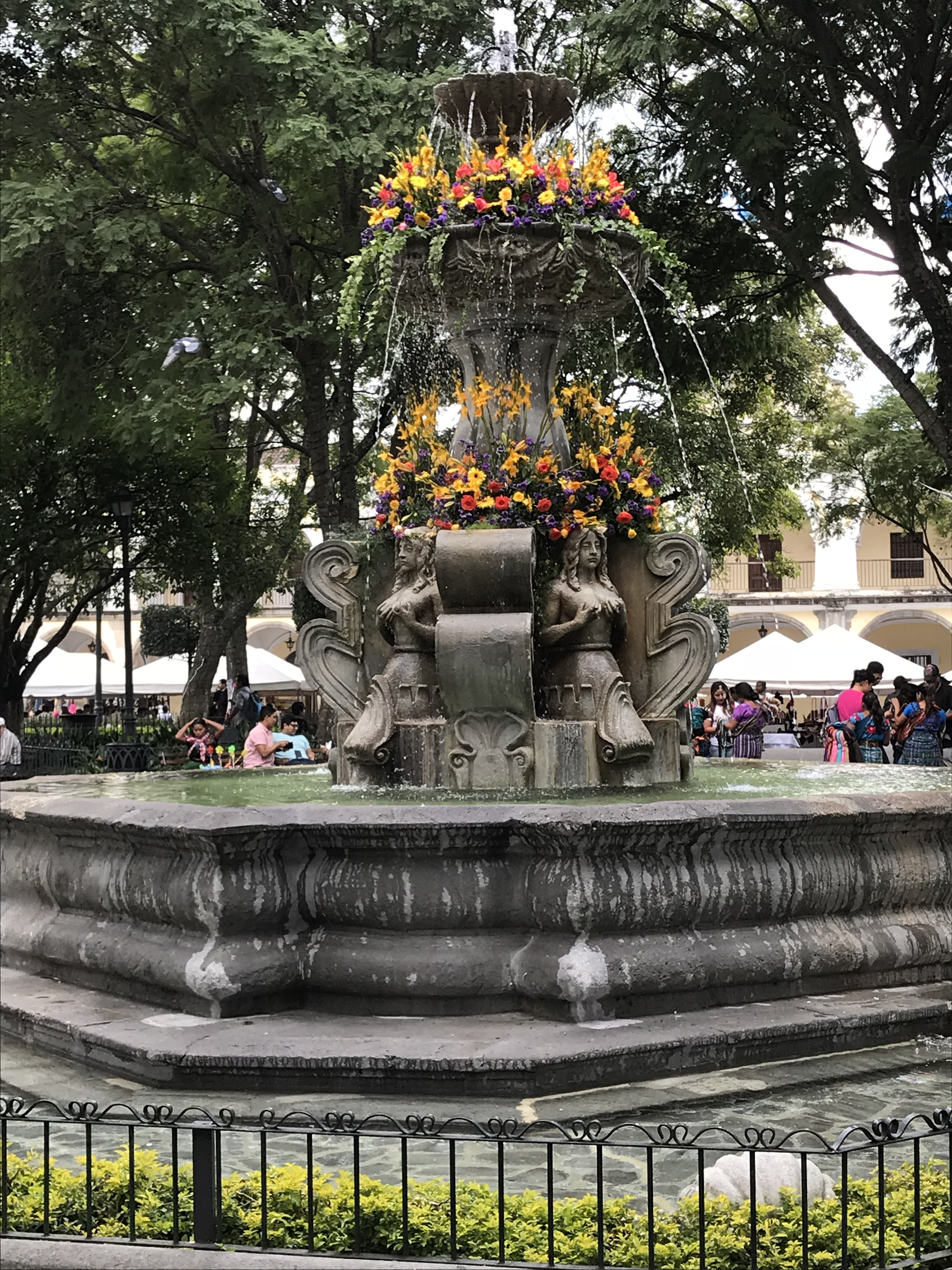
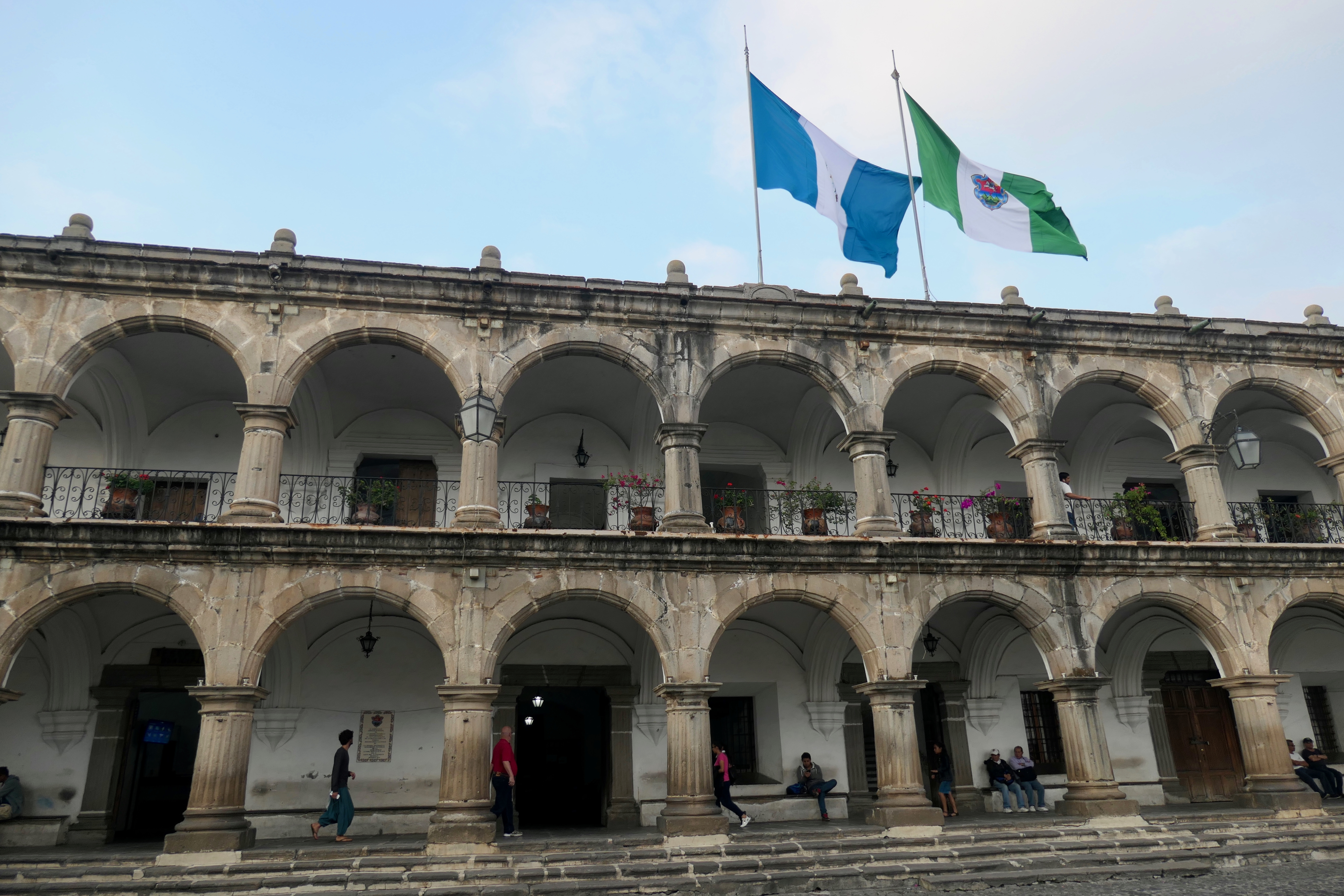
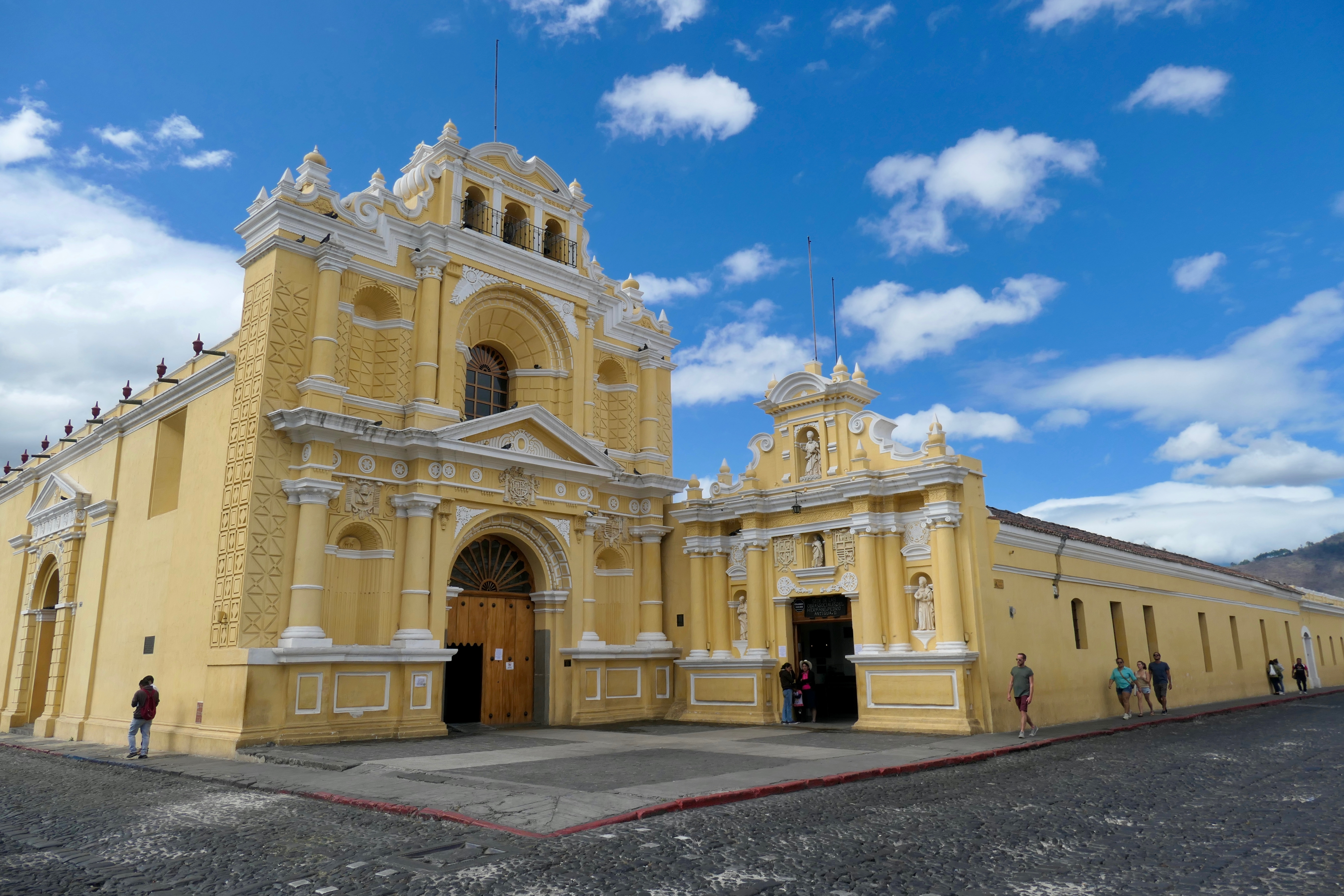
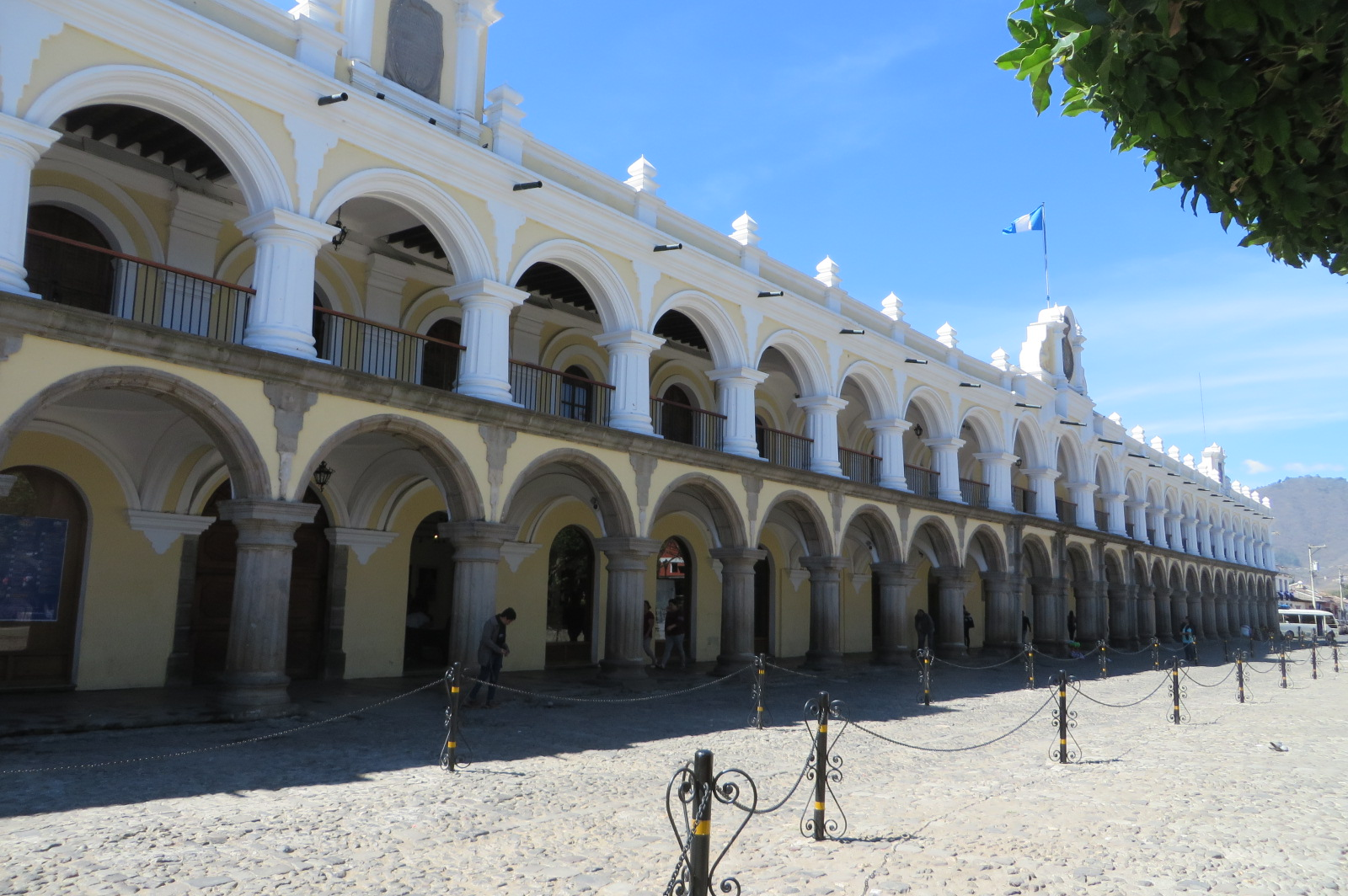
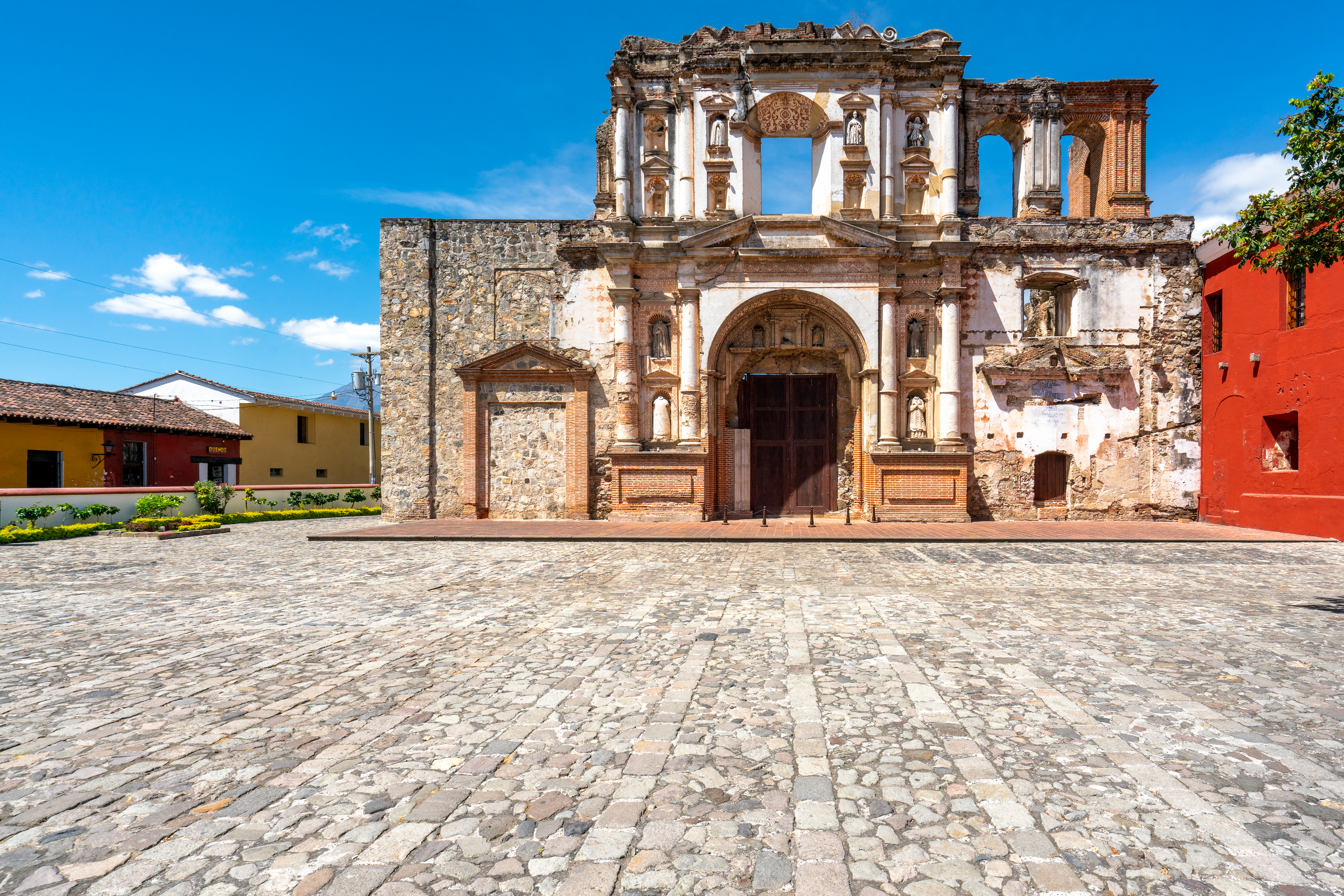
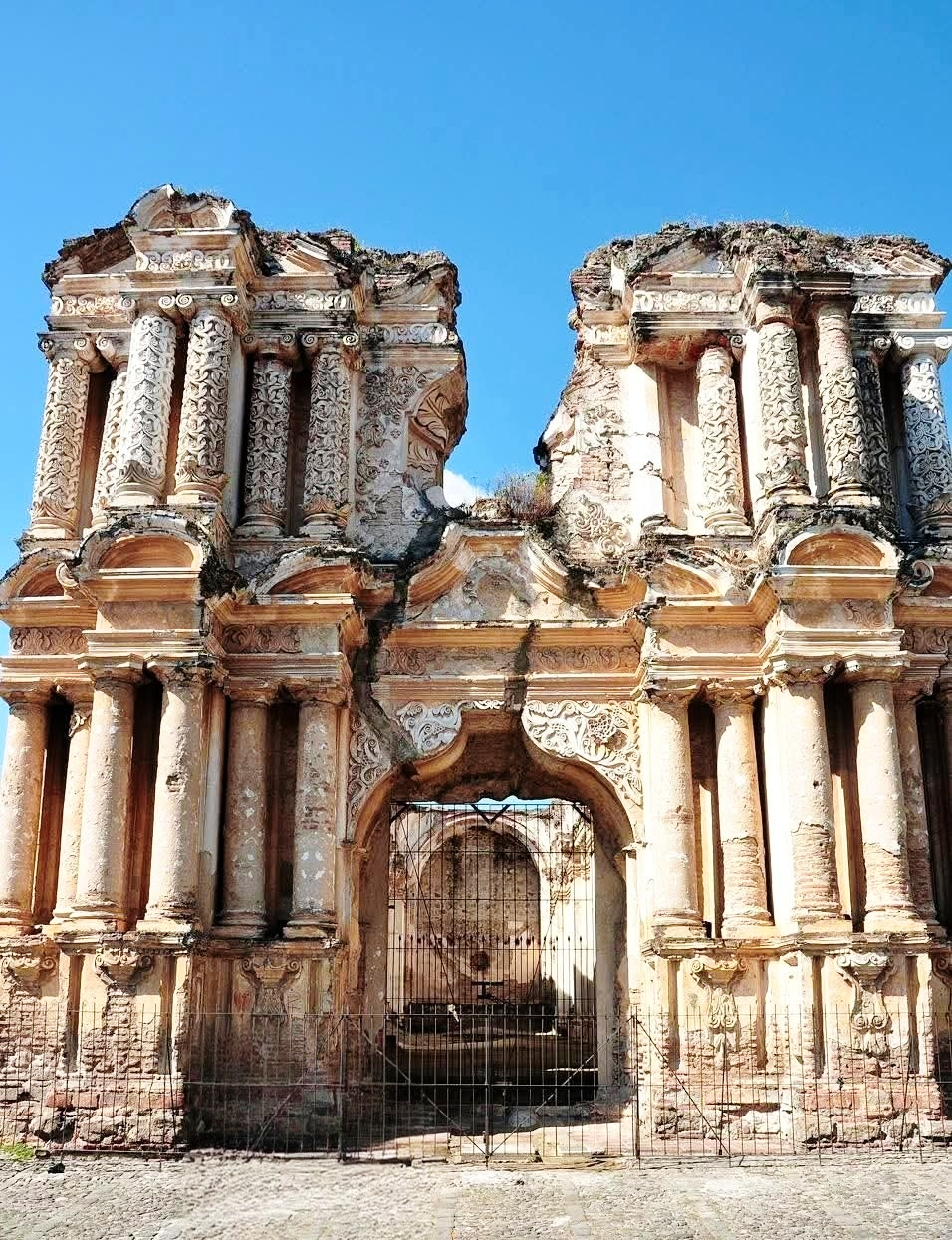
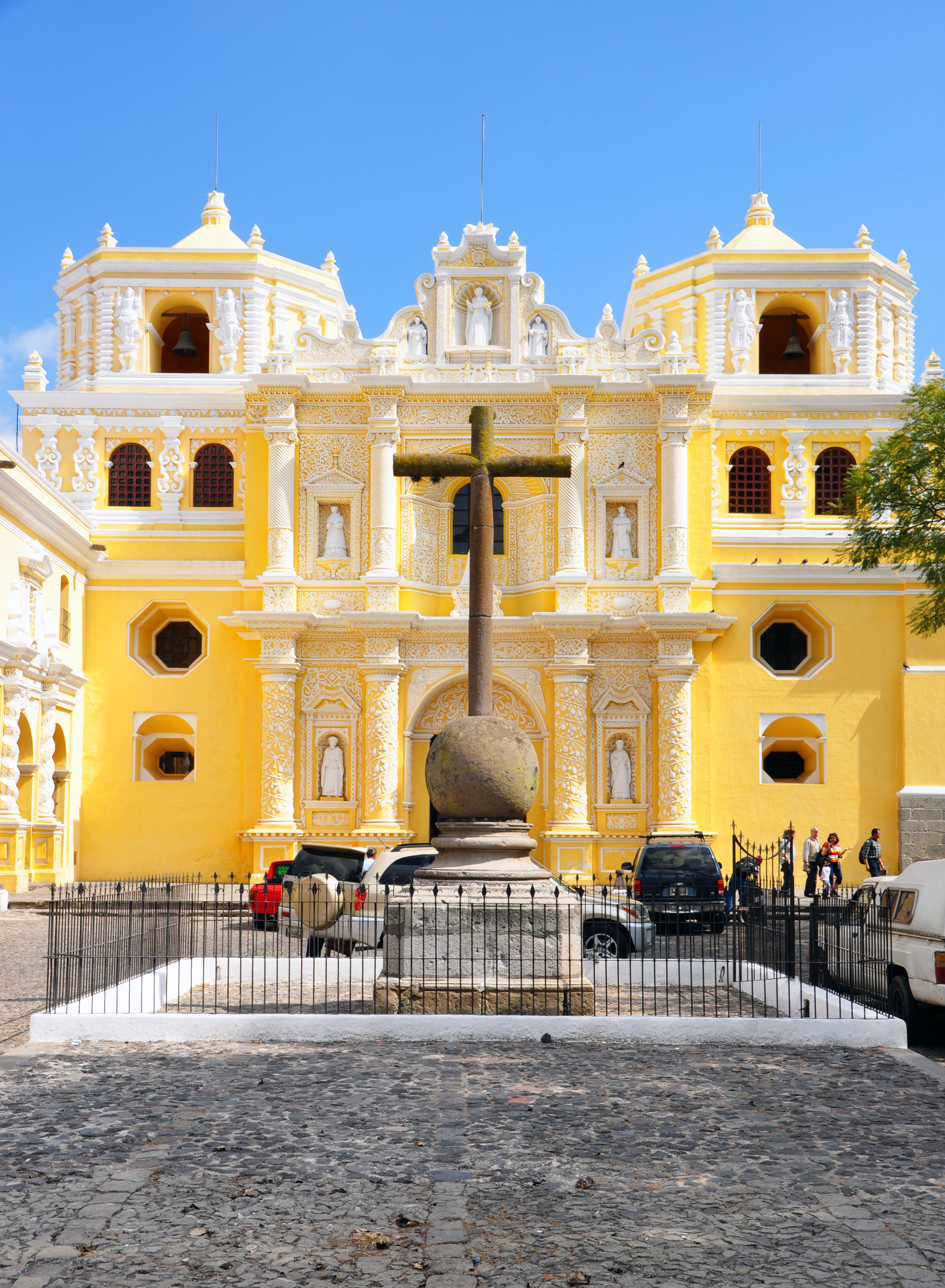
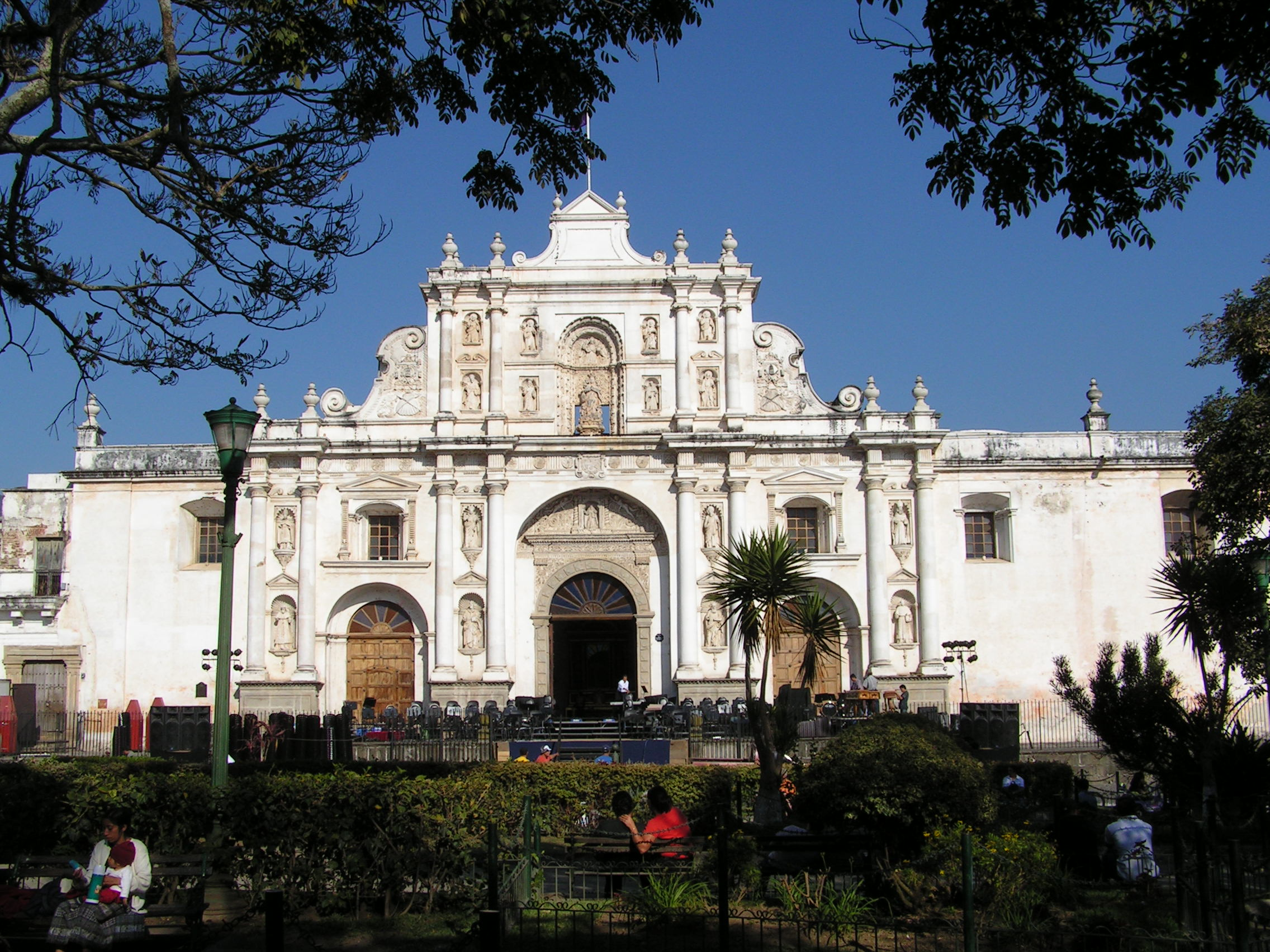
- Sta. Catalina Arch Fountain of the Sirens City Hall of Antigua Guatemala Church of San Pedro Palace of the Captains General Church of the Society of Jesus Church of Nuestra Señora del Carmen Church of La Merced Cathedral of San Jose

- Flag Seal
- Nickname: La Antigua or Antigua Guatemala
- Location in Guatemala Antigua Guatemala (Sacatepéquez Department)
- Coordinates: 14°33′27″N 90°44′00″W
- Country: Guatemala
- Department: Sacatepéquez
- Established: 1542

Government
  - Type: Municipal
  - Mayor: Juan Manuel Asturias Sueiras

Area
  - Total: 74.10 km^{2} (28.61 sq mi)
- Elevation: 1,545 m (5,069 ft)

Population (2023)
  - Total: 60,608
  - Rank: 32nd
  - Density: 810/km^{2} (2,100/sq mi)
- Demonym(s): antigueño, -a
- Climate: Cwb
- Website: http://muniantigua.gob.gt/

UNESCO World Heritage Site
- Criteria: Cultural: ii, iii, iv
- Reference: 65
- Inscription: 1979 (3rd Session)

Antigua Guatemala (Spanish pronunciation: [anˈtiɣwa ɣwateˈmala]), commonly known as Antigua or La Antigua, is a city in the central highlands of Guatemala. The city was the capital of the Captaincy General of Guatemala from 1543 through 1773, with much of its Baroque-influenced architecture and layout dating from that period. Antigua Guatemala serves as the capital of the homonymous municipality and the Sacatepéquez Department.

Because of its outstanding Spanish Baroque-influenced architecture, layout, churches, and ruins, and the city's importance during the early colonial period of the country, Antigua Guatemala was designated as a UNESCO World Heritage Site in 1979.

== History ==
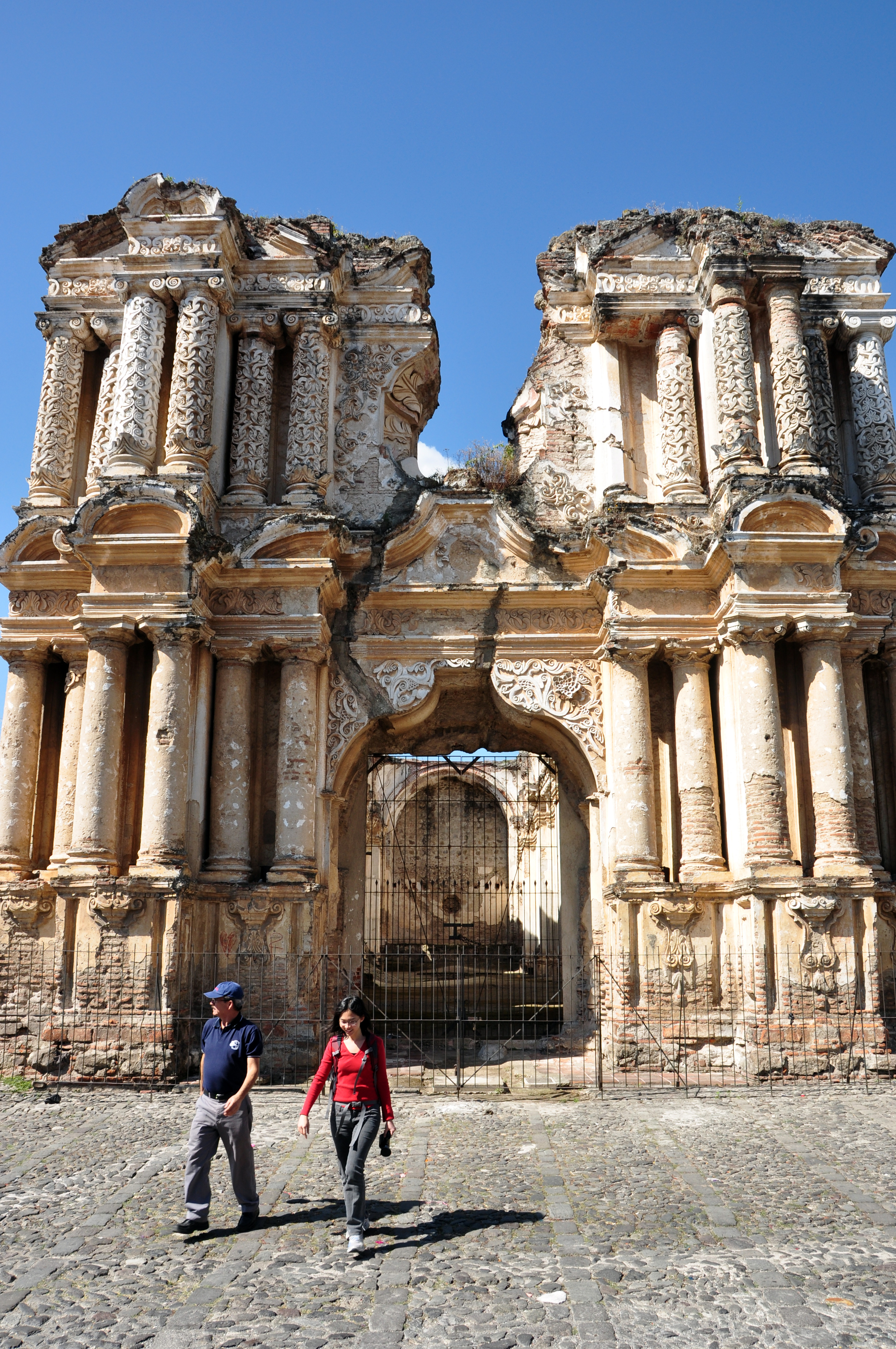
Façade of the former El Carmen church in 2009

Antigua Guatemala means "Old Guatemala" and was the third capital of Guatemala, formerly called "Santiago de los Caballeros de Guatemala".

=== 16th century ===
The first capital of Guatemala was founded east of Lake Atitlán, on the site of a Kaqchikel-Maya city, named Iximche, close to contemporary Tecpán, Guatemala, on Monday, July 25, 1524—the day of Saint James—and therefore named Ciudad de Santiago de los Caballeros de Guatemala (City of Saint James of the Knights of Guatemala). In accordance with Catholic tradition, St. James (Santiago) became the patron saint of the city.

After several Kaqchikel uprisings, the capital was moved to a more easily controlled site in the Valley of Almolonga, on November 22, 1527, and kept its original name. This new city was located on the site of present-day San Miguel Escobar, which is a neighborhood in the municipality of Ciudad Vieja (lit. "Old City") just south of contemporary Antigua. This second capital was destroyed on September 11, 1541, by a devastating lahar from the Volcán de Agua.

As a result, the colonial authorities decided to move the capital once more, this time eight kilometres (5 mi) north to the Panchoy Valley. So, on March 10, 1543, the Spanish conquistadors founded present-day Antigua, and again, it was named Santiago de los Caballeros. For 230 years, it served as the seat of the Captaincy General of Guatemala (Spanish: Capitanía General de Guatemala), also known as the Kingdom of Guatemala (Spanish: Reino de Guatemala), an administrative division of the Spanish Empire, under the viceroyalty of New Spain in Central America.

Hence Santiago de los Caballeros was the third seat of the capital of The Kingdom of Guatemala, which included the current nations of Guatemala, Belize, El Salvador, Honduras, Nicaragua and Costa Rica, plus the contemporary state of Chiapas in Mexico.

The new city was laid out in a square pattern, with streets running north to south and from east to west, with a central square. Both church and government buildings were designated important places around the central plaza. (Note: This square was also called "Plaza Mayor", "Plaza Real" and "Plaza de Armas".) Between 1549 and 1563, property southeast of the square was sold to the crown and occupied by the first president of the Real Audiencia de los Confines: the lawyer Alonso Lopez Cerrato, who also served as governor and captain general. (Note: Previously the audience was in the city of "Gracias a Dios" in Honduras, but there it lacked the appropriate conditions for its activities.)

Nestled within the high-altitude Valley of Guatemala —historically bounded by slopes, seasonal streams, and three stratovolcanoes— the urban layout was meticulously engineered to withstand seismic vulnerabilities while centralizing civic authority. This foundational geography structured the daily administration of the seventy-three surrounding indigenous villages and subordinate townships that sustained the colonial capital.

Due to constant problems between the conquerors and the representatives of the crown sent by the king of Spain, the Audiencia de los Confines was abolished in 1565. (Note: The Audiencia was called "of the Confines" because it was within the confines of New Spain and Peru.) In 1570 the assembly was restored, this time independent of the viceroy of Mexico, and was called Audiencia of Guatemala.

The Franciscan friars were the first to move into the valley Panchoy, the new capital of the Kingdom of Guatemala, and built a chapel on the site where later the Church Escuela de Cristo would be erected. This primitive chapel was destroyed in 1575 by an earthquake and during the next ten years collections were made to build the new complex, two blocks from the previous one. (Note: Parts of this construction are still preserved and may be the only ruins dating from the 16th century in the city of Antigua Guatemala.) The Franciscan complex became a major cultural and religious center for the entire Captaincy General of Guatemala. Theologians, jurists, philosophers, physicists, and mathematicians studied in the school of San Buenaventura, which was located where the monastery ruins are. Notable students included Cristóbal de Villalpando, Thomas Merlo, and Alonso de Paz.

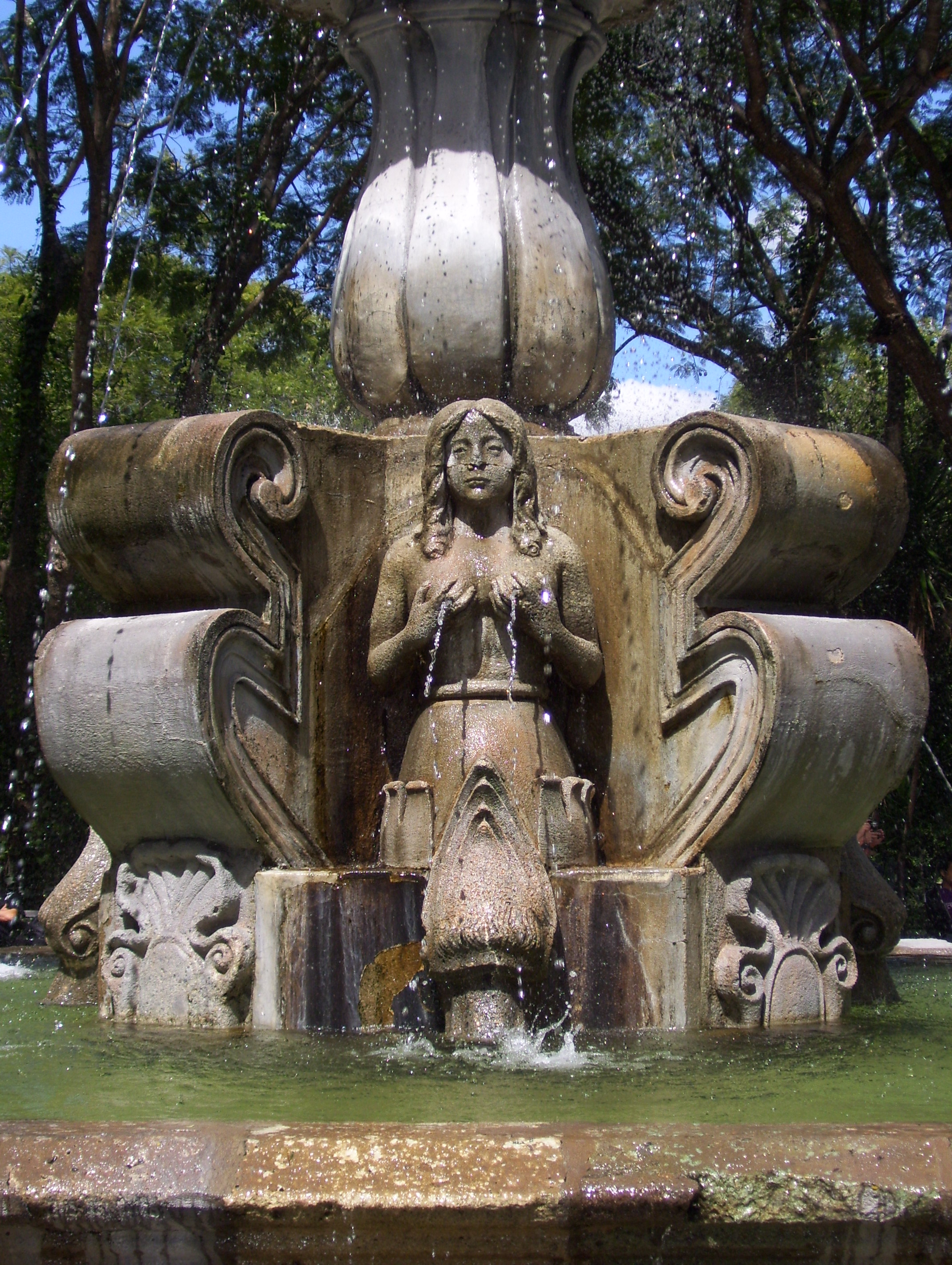
Mermaid Fountain, built by Diego de Porres in 1737, Antigua Guatemala central square

The first building of a cathedral was begun in 1545 with the debris brought from the destroyed settlement in the valley of Almolonga; however, its construction was hampered by frequent earthquakes throughout the years. The city was the final resting place of the great Spanish chronicler Bernal Díaz del Castillo, and his remains were interred in one of the churches that was eventually ruined by earthquakes.

The construction of the royal houses for the residence of the Captain General and the members of the Real Audiencia started in 1558; the complex also included the Royal Treasury, jail, Army quarters, the Hall of Arms, and the housing of Audiencia members.

In the sixteenth century, there were several important earthquakes on the following dates:

- March 21, 1530
- September 11, 1541
- 1565 (exact date unknown)
- 1575 (exact date unknown)
- November 30, 1577
- December 23, 1585

In 1566 King Felipe II of Spain gave it the title of "Muy Noble y Muy Leal" ("Very Noble and Very Loyal").

=== 17th century ===
The Jesuits founded the school of "San Lucas of the Society of Jesus" in 1608, which became famous and was unrivaled in terms of literature and grammar lessons; it was attended by the elite nobles of the city society, such as Francisco Antonio Fuentes y Guzman, the chronicler Francisco Vázquez, and Pedro Betancourt. On 18 July 1626, the Jesuit temple was inaugurated; along with the rest of the city, it suffered and was damaged by continuous earthquakes that struck the city between the sixteenth and eighteenth centuries.

The monks of San Juan de Dios founded their hospital and monastery in 1636 and thereafter were in charge of the hospitals in the Kingdom of Guatemala. Their hospitals were:

- San Alejo: for indigenous people
- San Pedro: for ecclesiastical personnel
- Santiago: for Spanish and mulattos
- San Lázaro
- San Juan de Dios: in 1667 the hospital of San Alejo was delivered to the Brothers of San Juan de Dios by the Dominicans who had managed it until then; in 1685, San Alejo and Santiago hospitals joined together, forming the Hospital San Juan de Dios.

The temple of the Escuela de Cristo -School of Christ- was founded in the parish of Our Lady of Remedios in 1664 and from 1689 onward it was known as the Congregation of San Felipe de Neri. Meanwhile, around 1690, the Jesuits founded another school: the "San Francisco de Borja" where the poet and priest Rafael Landivar, S.J., eventually would study and serve as principal.

==== Saint Hermano Pedro ====
Pedro de San José Betancourt came to Guatemalan land in 1650 from his native Tenerife. Upon arrival he suffered a serious illness, during which he had the first opportunity to be with the poor and dispossessed. After his recovery he wanted to pursue ecclesiastical studies but unable to do so, professed as a Franciscan tertiary in the Convent of San Francisco in Santiago de los Caballeros. He founded shelters for the poor, indigenous, and homeless, and founded the Order of the Brothers of Our Lady of Bethlehem in 1656, to serve the poor.

Santo Hermano Pedro wrote several books, including: Instruction De la Cruz's brother, Crown of the Passion of Jesus Christ our good or Rules Confraternity Betlemitas. He is considered the great evangelist of the West Indies, just as San Francisco Javier is to the East Indies. Brother Pedro attended to the poor, sick, orphaned, and dying, and was an early promoter of Human Rights. Additionally, he was the first literacy advocate in America, and the Order of Betlemitas in turn was the first religious order born in the Americas. The Santo Hermano Pedro was a man ahead of his time, both in his methods of teaching reading and writing to the illiterate and in medical patient treatment.

==== Royal and pontifical University of San Carlos Borromeo ====
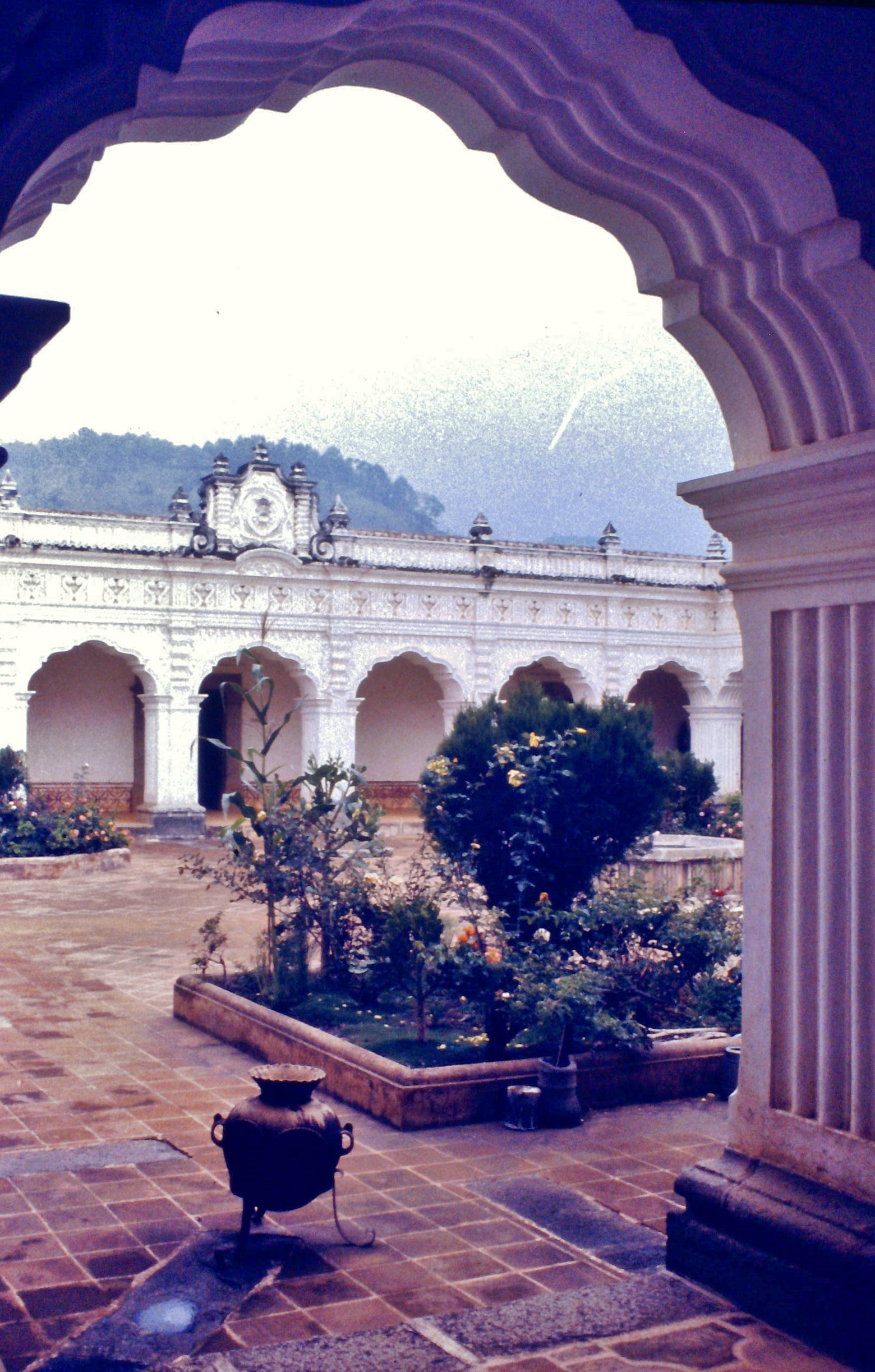
Royal and Pontifical University of San Carlos Borromeo. Picture from 1971

Francisco Marroquín, first bishop of Guatemala, sent the Spanish King a letter in 1548, asking for a superior education institution for Guatemala, but the letter went unanswered. Towards the end of his life, in 1562, Marroquín left some money in his will to establish a school -which eventually was the "Santo Tomás de Aquino school"- where grammar, arts, philosophy, and theology would be taught. Poor Spanish children would be the beneficiaries of this pious work, as they could not travel to those cities where there were universities already, such as México City in the New Spain. Historian John Tate Lanning said regarding this that, "Marroquín's testament is so famous, that many people who have not even laid eyes on it say that there are things in the document that are really not in it. Marroquín never talks about a University, much less establishing one..." On the other hand, there is indeed a document from Mayor Pedro Crespo Suarez, who left twenty thousand pesos after his death to set up classes in the university that "was being asked of the crown".

The Jesuits opposed a university establishment, given that they did not like the idea of having the other regular clergy orders -Mercedarians, Franciscans and Order of Preachers- taking the initiative in religious and educational issues. In August 1655, the Society of Jesus had bought the whole lot from the Díaz del Castillo family and by then, their San Lucas School was well known in the region and it even granted two university degrees. In 1653, the San Lucas School had a staff of only thirteen priests, a very small number compared to the size of the building; the Jesuits, however, made a major impact on the cultural and educational life in the Capitanía General of Guatemala. The school was the city's most prestigious, and from it graduated most of the elite members of society of the time. Most of its students were secular and went on to get the best positions in the country.

After several decades, petitions, and lawsuits, King Carlos II expedited a royal decree, on January 31, 1676, allowing Capitanía General of Guatemala to establish its university or "General Study". (Note: During the Spanish colony, "General Study" was another name for the universities.) After a lengthy and cumbersome organizational process that lasted five years, the university started classes on January 7, 1681, with more than sixty registered students under President Doctor José de Baños y Soto Mayor, Cathedral archdeacon, King of Spain preacher and Doctor from the University of Osuna. The university began its activities under the protection of Saint Carlos Borromeo, and its norms and regulations were copied from those of the México University which, in turn, were adapted from those of the Universidad de Salamanca in Spain.

The first classes given in the university were:

- Canonic law
- Medicine
- Scholastic theology
- Moral theology
- Languages

The Royal University of San Carlos Borromeo became pontifical via the papal bull of Pope Innocent XI, issued and dated 18 June 1687.

=== 18th century ===
==== San Miguel Earthquake ====
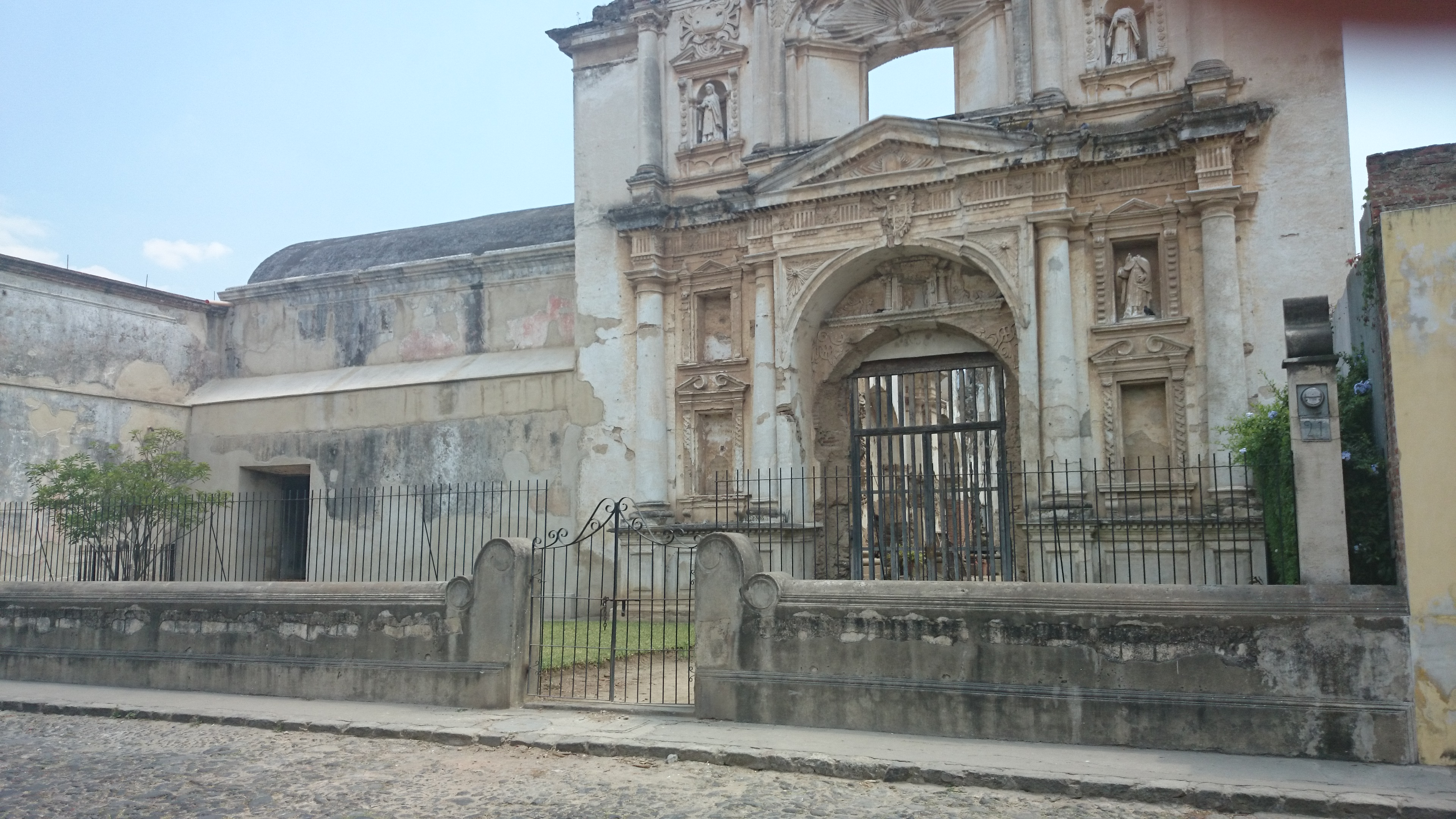
A church damaged by an earthquake

The strongest earthquakes experienced by the city of Santiago de los Caballeros before its final move in 1776 were the San Miguel earthquakes in 1717. At that time, the power of the Catholic Church over the Spanish Empire's citizens was absolute and any natural disaster was considered as divine punishment. In the city, people also believed that the proximity of the Volcán de Fuego (English: Volcano of Fire) was the cause of earthquakes; the great architect Diego de Porres even said that all the earthquakes were caused by volcano explosions.

On August 27 there was a strong eruption of Volcán de Fuego, which lasted until August 30; the residents of the city asked for help to Santo Cristo of the cathedral and to the Virgen del Socorro who were sworn patrons of the Volcan de Fuego. On August 29, a Virgen del Rosario procession took to the streets after a century without leaving her temple, and there were many more holy processions until 29 September, the day of San Miguel. Early afternoon earthquakes were minor, but at about 7:00 p.m. there was a strong earthquake that forced residents to leave their homes; tremors and rumblings followed until four o'clock. The neighbors took to the streets and loudly confessed their sins, bracing for the worst.

The San Miguel earthquake damaged the city considerably, to the point that some rooms and walls of the Royal Palace were destroyed. There was also a partial abandonment of the city, food shortages, lack of manpower, and extensive damage to the city infrastructure, not to mention numerous dead and injured. These earthquakes made the authorities consider moving to a new city less prone to seismic activity. City residents strongly opposed the move, and even took to the Royal Palace in protest; in the end, the city did not move, but the number of troops of the Army Battalion required to maintain order was considerable. The damage to the palace was repaired by Diego de Porres, who finished repairs in 1720, although there are indications that there was additional work done by Porres until 1736.

==== San Casimiro earthquake ====
On March 4, 1751, the San Casimiro earthquake destroyed the city of Santiago de Guatemala once more. The church roof of the Society of Jesus complex fell to the ground, forcing the Jesuits once again to ask for help from the parishioners to rebuild. Once again, the building was among the most beautiful in the city when the repairs were completed. In fact, a period of prosperity began after the San Casimiro earthquake, as the city saw major improvements such as street embellishment and the introduction of a tap water system. A new City Hall was built, and on July 17, 1753, work on the Jesuit plaza in front of the church was finished.

==== Santa Marta earthquake ====
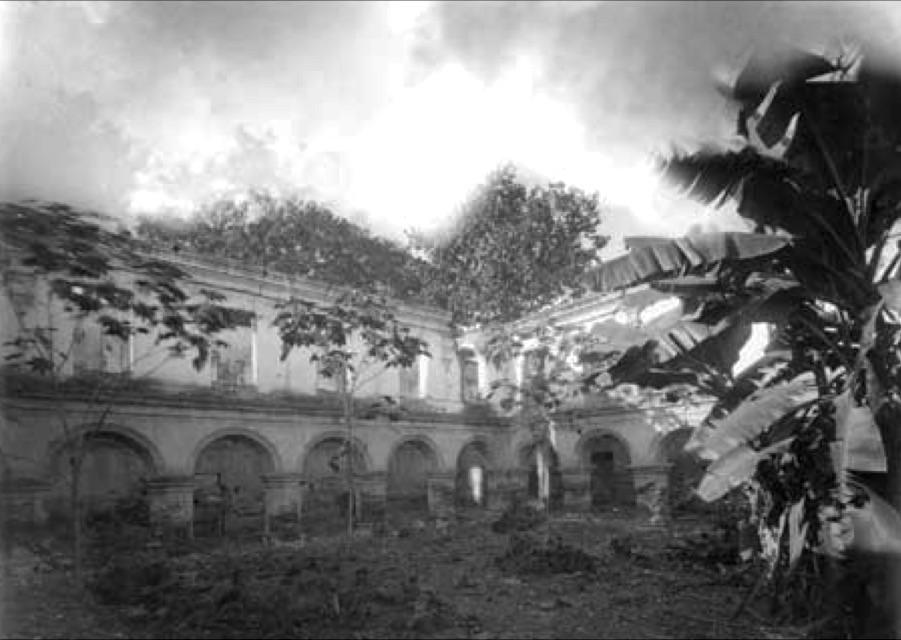
Ruins of the Society of Jesus school yard in 1880

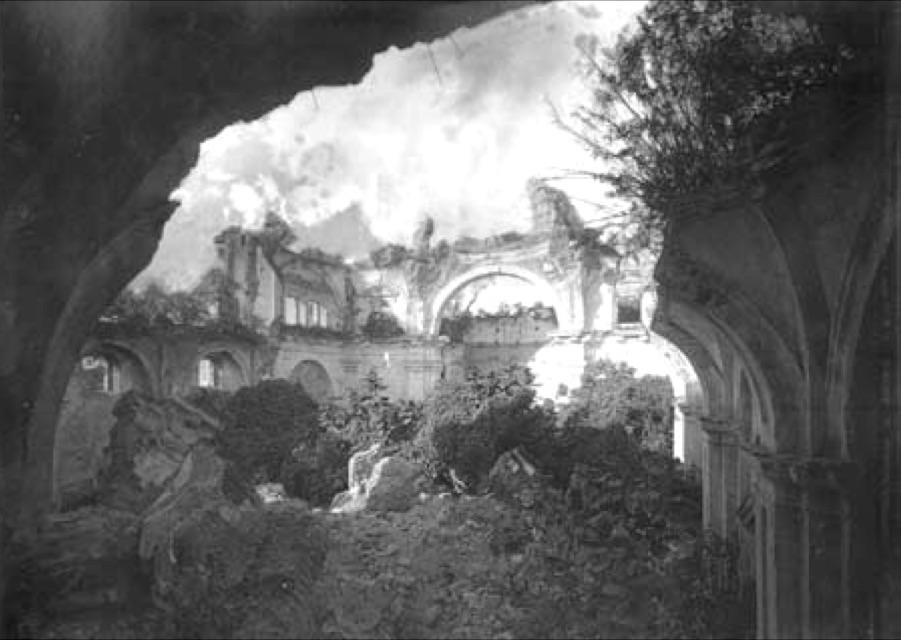
Ruins of the Society of Jesus church interior in 1880

On 12 June 1773 Captain General Martín de Mayorga was inaugurated, and alongside Cortés y Larráz and the regular clergy vicars, were the top authorities in the Kingdom of Guatemala and would be the main characters in the events that followed the 1773 earthquakes.

In 1773, the Santa Marta earthquakes destroyed much of the town, which led to the third change in location for the city. The Spanish Crown ordered, in 1776, the removal of the capital to a safer location, the Valley of the Shrine, where Guatemala City, the modern capital of Guatemala, now stands. This new city did not retain its old name and was christened Nueva Guatemala de la Asunción (New Guatemala of the Assumption), and its patron saint is Our Lady of the Assumption. The badly damaged city of Santiago de los Caballeros was ordered abandoned, although not everyone left, and was thereafter referred to as la Antigua Guatemala (the Old Guatemala).

The Santa Marta earthquake practically demolished the church and sections of the convent of the Society of Jesus. Its cloisters and towers were in ruins, the walls were at dangerous angles, and the "Casa de Ejercicios" was turned into rubble. By a Royal decree of July 21, 1775, the city move to the "Virgin valley" was authorized. This was a final order that had to be obeyed by all the people, who started to move slowly, starting in December of that year. In order to build the new city it was necessary to get construction material from the old abandoned churches in Santiago de Guatemala. However, in the case of the Society of Jesus church, there was strong opposition from the neighbors to any possible dismantling of the structure since they considered that it could still be repaired.

=== 19th century ===
==== After the capital moved to La Ermita ====
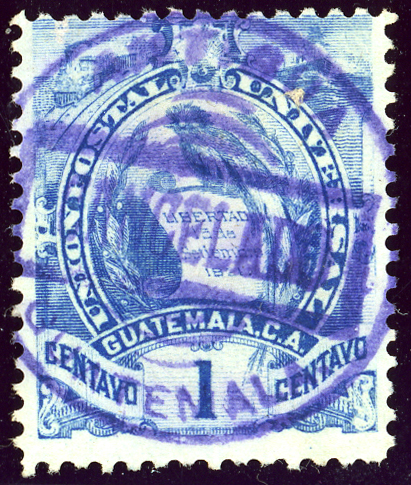
Postmark ANTIGUA CANCELADO in 1887, after Guatemala joined the UPU. Note the Quetzal.

After the independence of Guatemala from Spain in 1821, the Jesuit complex became public property once again and was in several lawsuits that lasted until 1829, when the regular clergy and the conservative Aycinena clan were expelled from Central America after the invasion of liberal general Francisco Morazán and the establishment of a secular government. The new liberal government decreed that all the confiscated Catholic church possessions had to be turned into elementary schools and university classrooms.

As of 1850, Antigua had an estimated population of 9,000. and by 1865, the building was functioning as a vapor activated thread mill, but it was not profitable due to a lack of expert technicians and raw material; and by 1872, the Jesuits were once again expelled from Guatemala by the liberal regime of Justo Rufino Barrios.

In 1884 City Hall made an announcement that it intended to transform the old Society of Jesus buildings into a market, in spite of the strong opposition from the neighbors that already had small shops on the plaza. It was not until 1912 that a market was placed in the complex.

=== 20th century ===
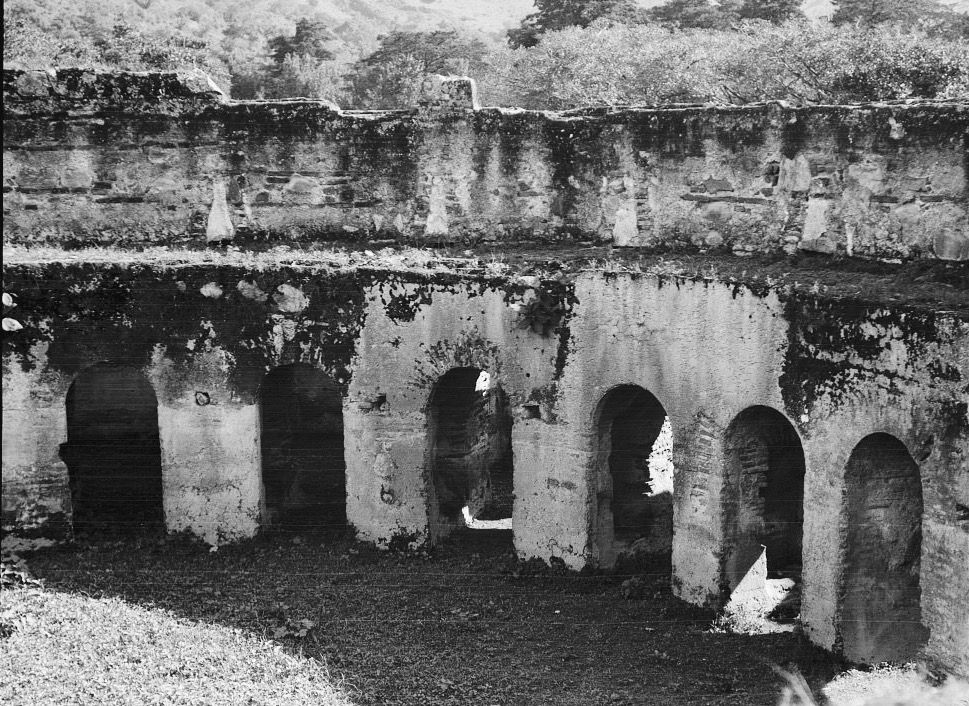
Circular single cell structure in the Capuchins convent, still in good standing, as described by prince Wilhelm of Sweden in 1920. Photograph by Arnold Genthe.

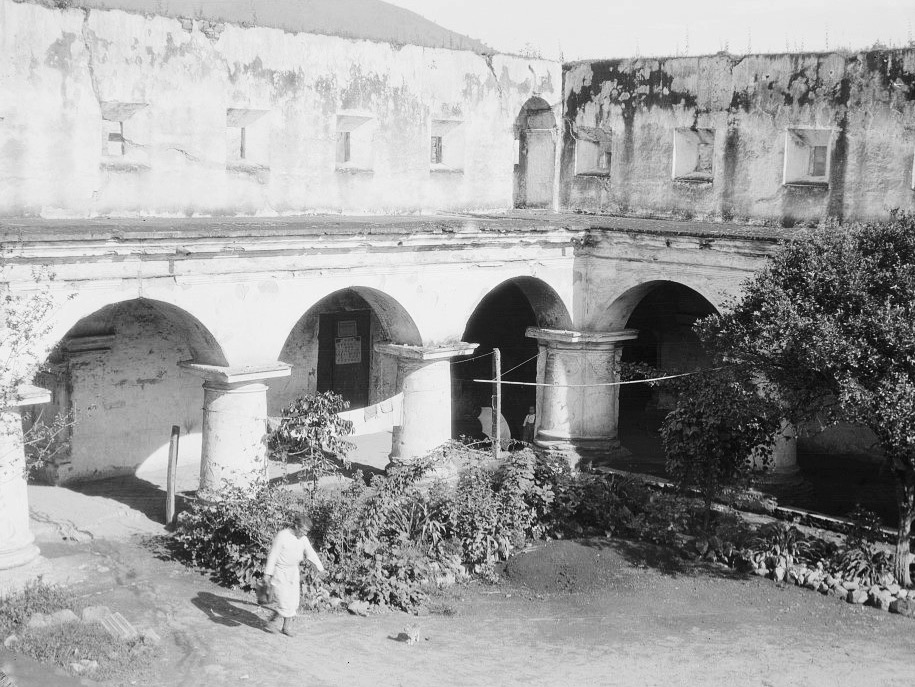
A poor native family living in the ruins of Capuchins, as described by prince Wilhelm of Sweden in 1920. Photograph by Arnold Genthe.

In April 1920, during the very last days of Manuel Estrada Cabrera regime, prince Wilhelm of Sweden visited Antigua Guatemala and wrote about his impressions of the city in his book Between Two Continents. His book is an objective description of the terrible conditions the road and the ruins used to be in: "For some little way outside Guatemala City it was a fairly decent car ride, but then the roads began developing sand drifts, and later, rockfalls of tumbled stone as two years earlier, the country had been devastated by a powerful earthquake and government corruption made the recovery impossible". "The hills grew steeper and steeper, the jolting more pronounced and the stones even sharper; besides, on top of the road was a two-foot layer of dust which hid the pitfalls but did not detract from their effect". "Along the way, they passed long lines of Indians on their way to Guatemala City, carrying their heavy burdens with apparent ease; men, women and children carried something in the way of a load, and they all carried it quickly. With respect to traffic, it was almost non-existent, aside from mule-pulled wagons".

After passing Mixco, the road proceeded more steeply upward, with a precipitous drop on one side and sheer cliff rising on the other; here and there a cross stood by the wayside, marking the spot where some traveler had died. After reaching the highest point, they started down towards Antigua. The city was in sight when a person in uniform planted himself in front of the car; it turned out to be the city commandant, along with six soldiers with wooden guns. Compared to Guatemala City at the time, Antigua was quite nicely kept, although all the churches were equally dilapidated and left entirely to themselves, as rebuilding since 1773 was confined to the strictly necessary. For the most part, only blank walls and shattered domes remained to greet the visitor by 1920, and some of the churches were in pitiful conditions. In Santa Clara, for example, a mule was grazing, and in the Church of Grace a native family had taken up its quarters, along with their varied collection of domestic animals.

But there were other monuments in decent shape:

- The Escuela de Cristo was one of the best preserved churches and was united with a convent that was still standing. The priest that received the Prince and his three companions told them that all the silver and gold from the church had already been sold by his predecessors, so that he, to his extreme regret, was unable to sell any to them.
- The old Capuchin monastery with its many underground passages from the monks' cells to those of the nuns was worth a visit, especially one part where the cells were built in a circle surrounding a central common chamber.

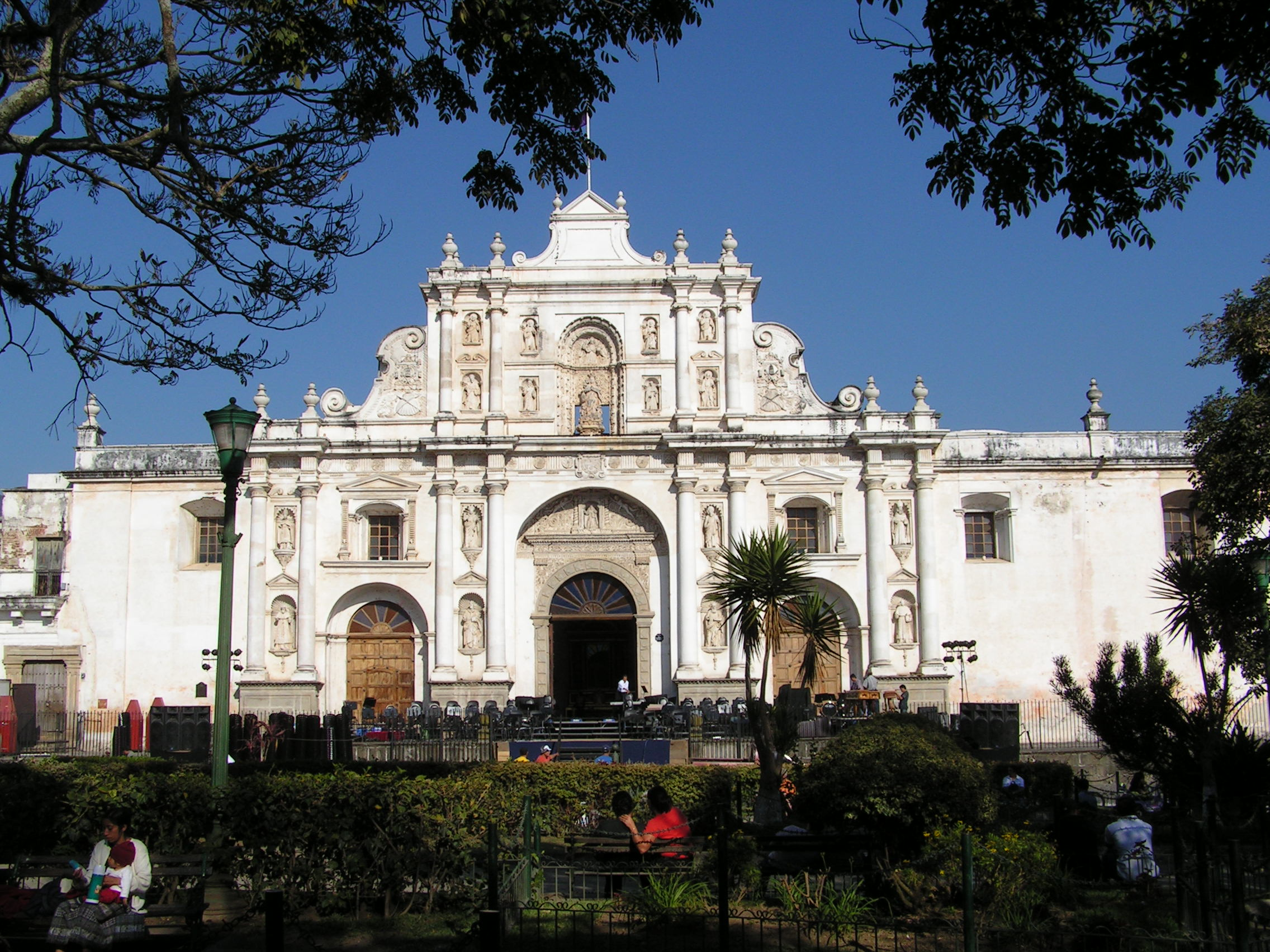
San José Parish in the former Metropolitan Cathedral of Santiago.

== Geography ==
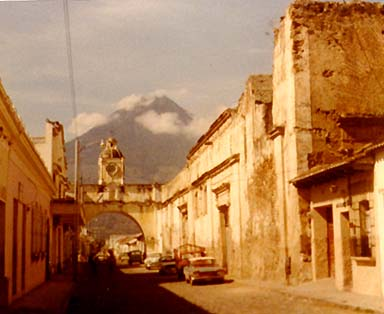
Arch connecting two parts of old Convent, Volcán de Agua in background

Three large volcanoes dominate the horizon around Antigua. The most commanding, to the south of the city, is the Volcán de Agua or "Volcano of Water", some 3,766 m (12,356 ft) high. When the Spanish arrived, the inhabitants of the area, Kakchikel Mayas, called it Hunapú (and they still do). However, it became known as Volcán de Agua after a lahar from the volcano buried the second site of the capital, which prompted the Spanish authorities to move the capital to present-day Antigua. The original site of the second capital is now the village San Miguel Escobar.

To the west of the city are a pair of peaks, Acatenango, which last erupted in 1972, 3,976 m (13,045 ft) high, and the Volcán de Fuego, 3,763 m (12,346 ft) high. Fuego is famous for being almost constantly active at a low level. Steam and gas issue from its top almost daily, while a larger eruption occurred in September 2012.

=== Climate ===
Antigua Guatemala has a subtropical highland climate (Köppen: Cwb).

Climate data for Antigua Guatemala
Month	Jan	Feb	Mar	Apr	May	Jun	Jul	Aug	Sep	Oct	Nov	Dec	Year
Mean daily maximum °C (°F)	22.5 (72.5)	23.4 (74.1)	24.7 (76.5)	25.0 (77.0)	24.7 (76.5)	23.6 (74.5)	23.5 (74.3)	23.8 (74.8)	23.1 (73.6)	22.7 (72.9)	22.8 (73.0)	22.3 (72.1)	23.5 (74.3)
Daily mean °C (°F)	16.6 (61.9)	17.2 (63.0)	18.3 (64.9)	19.1 (66.4)	19.5 (67.1)	19.4 (66.9)	19.0 (66.2)	19.0 (66.2)	18.7 (65.7)	18.3 (64.9)	17.7 (63.9)	16.8 (62.2)	18.3 (64.9)
Mean daily minimum °C (°F)	10.8 (51.4)	11.1 (52.0)	11.9 (53.4)	13.3 (55.9)	14.3 (57.7)	15.3 (59.5)	14.6 (58.3)	14.3 (57.7)	14.4 (57.9)	13.9 (57.0)	12.7 (54.9)	11.3 (52.3)	13.2 (55.7)
Average precipitation mm (inches)	1 (0.0)	3 (0.1)	4 (0.2)	25 (1.0)	118 (4.6)	231 (9.1)	170 (6.7)	141 (5.6)	220 (8.7)	131 (5.2)	16 (0.6)	5 (0.2)	1,065 (42)
Source: Climate-Data.org; Instituto Nacional de Sismología, Vulcanología, Meteorología e Hidrología de Guatemala

== Population ==
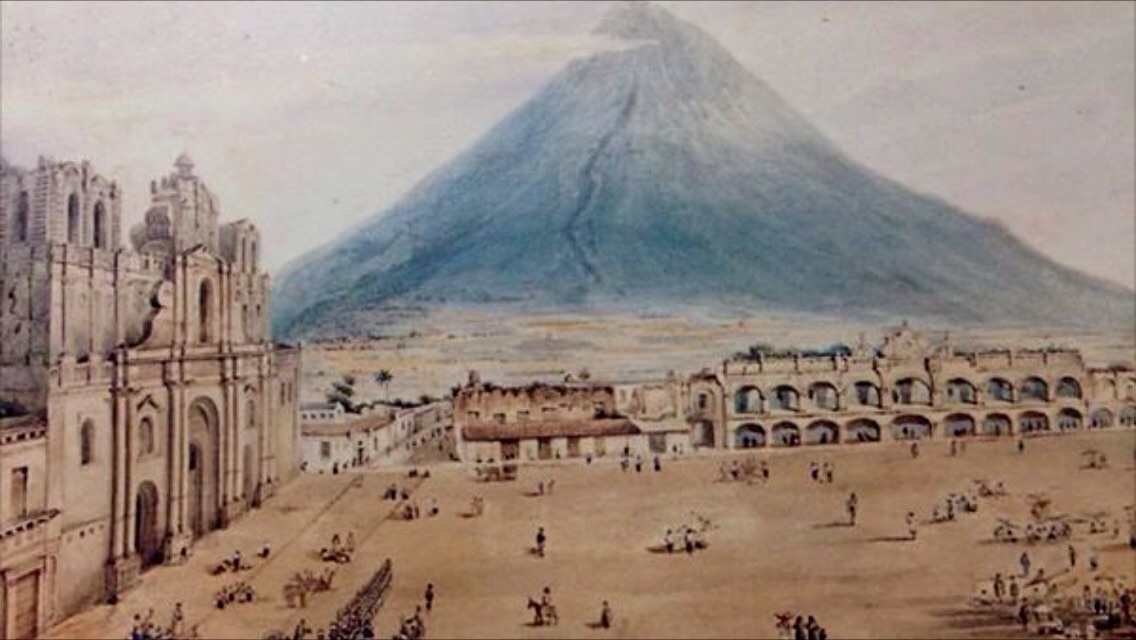
Central square of Antigua Guatemala in 1887.

The city had a peak population of some 65,000 in the 1770s; the bulk of the population moved away in the late 18th century after the 1773 Guatemala earthquake. Despite significant population growth in the late 20th century, the city had only reached half that number by the 1990s. At the time of the 2007 census, the city had 34,685 inhabitants.

== Economy ==
Historically, the area was considered to be one of the finest agriculturally in Guatemala. Tourism is the main driver of the present-day economy. Antigua is also a coffee-producing region of Anacafé.

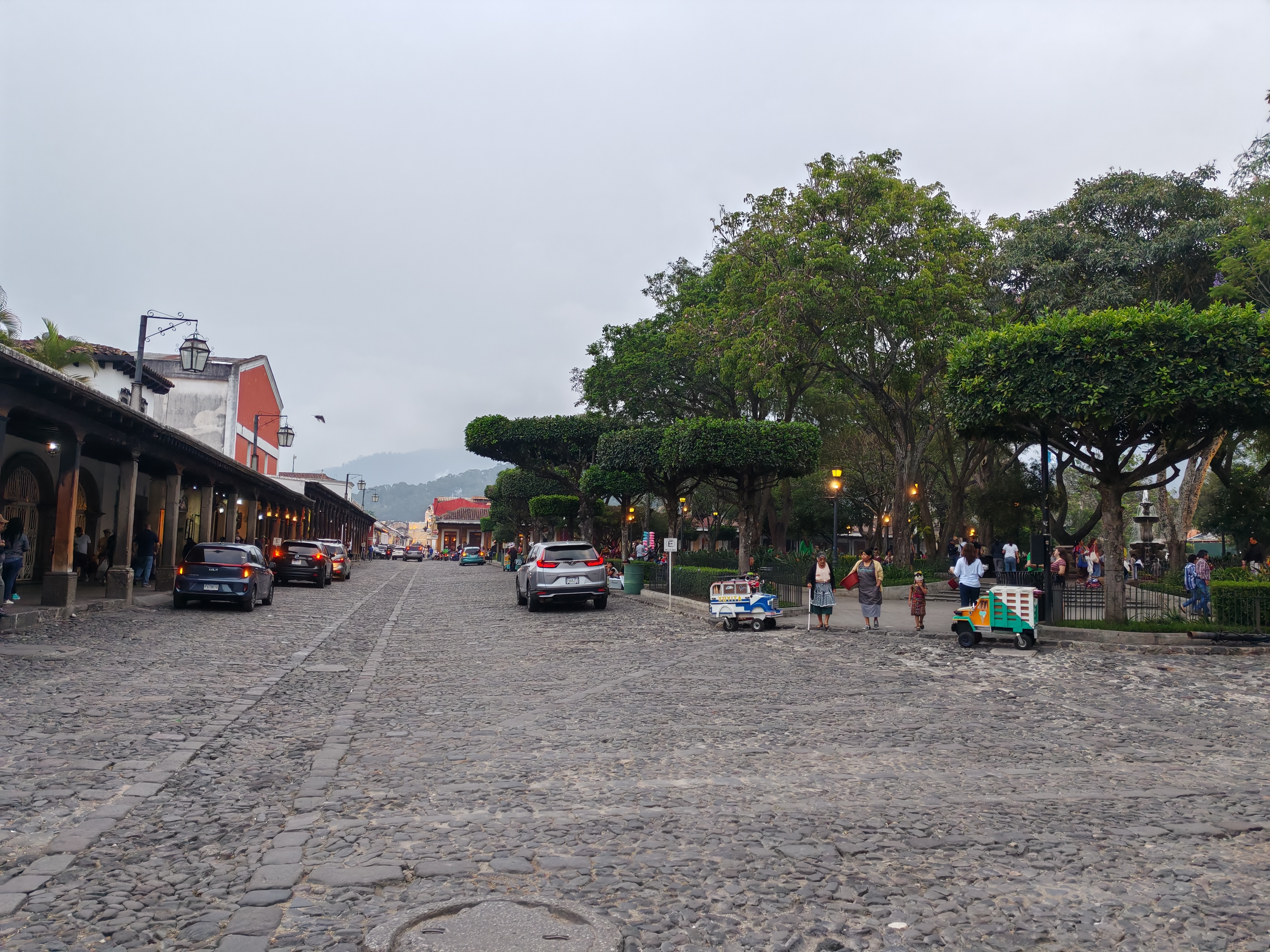
Streets and the central park of Antigua Guatemala

== Health ==
Antigua is served by two main hospitals, Hospital Nacional Pedro de Bethancourt and a Guatemalan Institute of Social Security hospital. Emergency medical services are provided by Bomberos Municipales (Guatemala) and Bomberos Voluntarios (Guatemala), who have both previously worked with LFR International to improve prehospital care.

== Tourism and historic sites ==
Antigua is the most popular tourist destination in Guatemala, with easy access from Guatemala City and La Aurora International Airport.

Central Park (Parque Central) is the heart of the city, with the reconstructed fountain there acting as a popular gathering spot. To the north of the Central Park is the Arco de Santa Catalina, one of the most recognizable architectural landmarks of Antigua.

Antigua is the jumping-off-point for hikes of the Acatenango (Fuego) and Pacaya volcanos.

=== Spanish colonial monuments ===
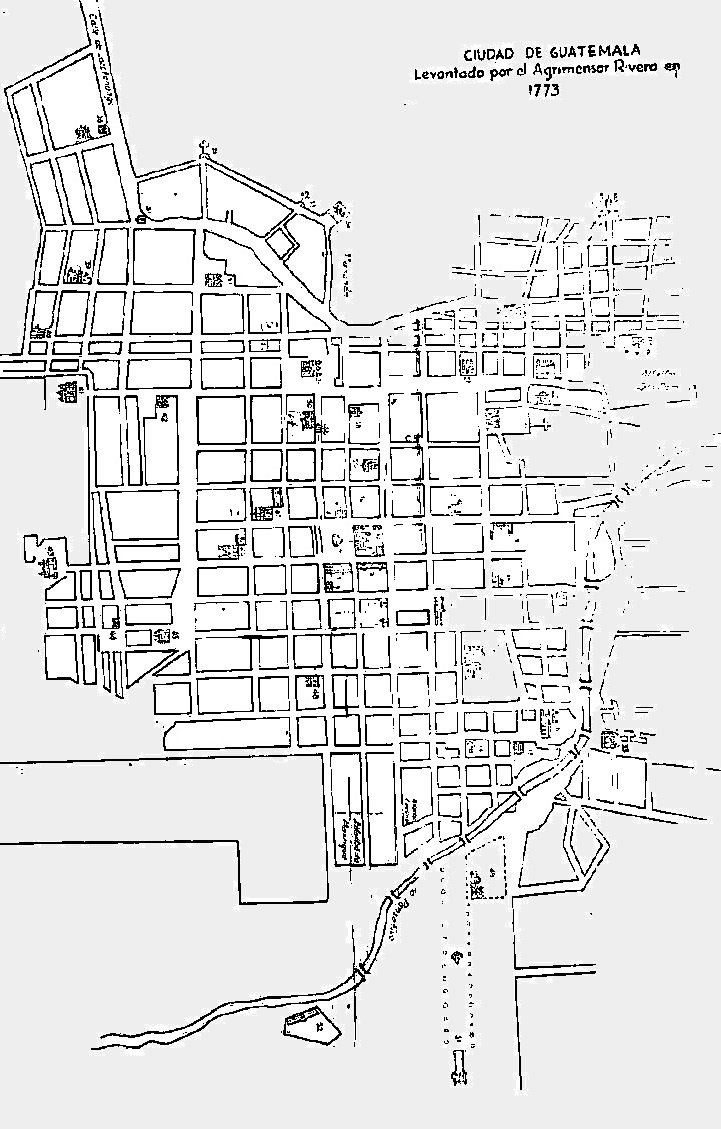
Some of Antigua Guatemala's colonial monuments

Before it was declared a National Monument by president Jorge Ubico on March 30, 1944, the city ruins were practically abandoned. The following galleries show images of the destruction of the structures due to earthquakes and abandonment. There were other churches, such as Nuestra Señora del Carmen and the Society of Jesus, that endured the 1773 earthquake relatively well, but they were abandoned and the earthquakes from 1917 to 1918 and 1976 destroyed them. In the particular case of de San Francisco El Grande church, it was in good structural condition after the 1773 and 1917 earthquakes, and it was rebuilt in 1967 when the Franciscans returned to Guatemala. This eventually protected the structure from significant damage in the 1976 earthquake. Finally, La Merced church was practically new in 1773, and it has withstood time and earthquakes since; the church was not abandoned in 1776, but it was indeed abandoned in 1829 when the Mercedarians were expelled from Central America by general Francisco Morazán, along with the rest of regular clergy and the conservative party members and Aycinena family.

Name	Picture	Brief description
Captain General Palace		Residence of the Captain General of General Captaincy of Guatemala during the Spanish colony. After the Santa Marta earthquake in 1773 it was abandoned and used as a warehouse. In the 21st century the buildings include the offices of Guatemala Institute of Tourisms -INGUAT-, the city National Police headquarters and the Sacatepéquez Governor's office, among others.
City Hall		
Cathedral of Saint James San José Parish		The first building was begun in 1545 with rubble brought from the destroyed settlement in the valley of Almolonga. Its construction was hampered by frequent earthquakes. A second sanctuary would be inaugurated in 1680. Cathedral status was obtained in 1743. The first cathedral housed the remains of the conquistador Pedro de Alvarado who had been transferred there at the request of his daughter in 1568, but disappeared following one of the multiple earthquakes that damaged the city over the years.
Church and Convent of Capuchins		Originally called "Convent and Church of Our Lady of the Pond of Zaragoza", was approved by Felipe V in 1725. Construction work began in 1731 and the building was consecrated in 1736. The daily routine of the professed was governed by strict regulatory rules including the strictest poverty, penance, and fasting; also the discalced nuns had to survive on handouts provided by the faithful. After the Santa Marta earthquake, although the convent was not completely affected, its assets were transferred to the new Guatemala de la Asunción by order of the Captain General.
La Recolección		In 1685 two "Recoleto" missionaries came to the city of Santiago de los Caballeros, and when some more monks of their order arrived in the following years, asked permission of the City Hall (Note: i.e., Local authorities chosen among the criollo people.) to build a monastery; but in 1695, the City Hall made it known that there was insufficient reason to justify the construction because there were already enough monasteries in the city. Following this refusal, the friars went to the Real Audiencia (Note: Royal emissaries from the Spanish Crown.) which authorized construction in 1700, by a royal decree. Construction of the buildings began in 1701, and six years later the first stone of the church was placed. In 1708 the convent, library and infirmary were completed. The church was inaugurated on May 23, 1717.
San Francisco		This was the first sanctuary built on Santiago de los Caballeros in the 16th century. Since its beginning, it has suffered seismic damage: in 1565 the first building was severely damaged and the tremors continued until 1773. After being abandoned for almost two hundred years, the Franciscans recovered the property, and it has been open for Catholic worship since. The facade of the church is adorned with baroque columns and two bell towers. Adjacent to the church are the ruins of the old Franciscan convent. The temple has a special chapel that houses the remains of Saint Hermano Pedro de San José de Betancur, a missionary from the Canary Islands.
La Merced Church		Architect Juan de Dios Estrada was in charge of its construction, which began in 1749. The temple was inaugurated in 1767 and is in ultra baroque Guatemalan style with two bell towers.
Church and School of the Society of Jesus		Created by Royal Decree dated August 9, 1561, it was built with money donated in part by the chronicler Bernal Diaz del Castillo. Originally it consisted of three cloisters and a temple, and eventually hosted up to twelve Jesuits. It worked as "Colegio de San Lucas of the Society of Jesus" from 1608 until the order was expelled in 1767: "The school became famous and was unrivaled in terms of teaching of literature and grammar; it served the elite of Santiago de los Caballeros society, and among its students were chroniclers Francisco Antonio Fuentes y Guzmán and Francisco Vázquez, and priests Pedro Betancourt and Rafael Landívar." The structure remained in relatively good condition after the 1773 earthquake, but it was eventually destroyed by the 1917–18 and 1976 earthquakes.
Santo Domingo Monastery		Originally one of the most important and largest in the city, the Convent of Santo Domingo was destroyed in 1773 and abandoned by the transfer of the Dominicans to their site in Guatemala City . The ruins were sold to individuals and converted into the Hotel Casa Santo Domingo in 1989. In 2013 the 43rd General Assembly of the Organization of American States was held at their facilities.
Escuela de Cristo Church		The temple was founded in the parish of the Holy Cross in 1664 and from 1689 it was known as the "Congregation of San Felipe de Neri". Due to the earthquakes in San Miguel in 1717 the building was damaged; the reconstruction was finalized in 1730 under the leadership of Mayor Architect Diego de Porres. In 1784, it was moved to "Our Lady of Remedies" parish, when the clergy of this church moved to Nueva Guatemala de la Asunción. The façade has an architectural renaissance style and is made of stone, like the church of the Capuchins, a characteristic that distinguishes them from the other temples in the city. In this church were originally the remains of Pedro de San José de Betancur.
Nuestra Señora del Carmen Church		Even though it survived the Santa Marta earthquakes, it was almost destroyed by the earthquakes of 1917-18 and 1976. However, its façade survived in very good condition, and has been admired ever since as an example of Guatemalan Baroque.
San Pedro Hospital		The monks of San Juan de Dios congregation founded their first hospital and monastery in 1636 and were in charge of the hospitals in the Kingdom of Guatemala ever since. San Pedro Hospital in particular was exclusively for ecclesiastical people.
La Concepción convent		It had been misidentified as the palace of Sister Juana de Maldonado, but recent research has shown that the cloister dates from the 18th century while the famous Guatemalan concepcionista nun lived in the 17th century.
Chapel of the Holy Cross		

=== Holy Week ===
La Antigua is noted for its very elaborate religious celebrations during Lent (Cuaresma), leading up to Holy Week (Semana Santa) and Easter (Pascua). Each Sunday during Lent, one of the local parishes sponsors a Procession through the streets of Antigua. Elaborate and artistic carpets, predominantly made of dyed sawdust, flowers, pine needles, and even fruits and vegetables, adorn the processions' paths.

The most traditional processions are:

Holy week traditional processions in Antigua Guatemala
Day	Picture	Church	Hours
Fifth Sunday of Lent	Jesús de la Caída	San Bartolomé Becerra	7:00 am – 10:00 pm
Friday of Sorrows	Viacrucis del Hermano Pedro (varones)	San Francisco el Grande	3:00 pm – 6:00 pm
Palm Sunday	Palm procession	Jocotenango Sacatepéquez	6:30 am – 12:00 pm
Palm Sunday	Palm procession (live representation)	La Merced, Santa Ana, Escuela de Cristo, San Felipe de Jesús	8:00 am – 12:00 pm
Palm Sunday	Jesús Nazareno de la Reseña	La Merced	11:00 am – 11:00 pm
Holy Monday	Jesús Nazareno	Santa Inés del Monte Pulciano	N/A
Holy Tuesday	Jesús Nazareno del Silencio	El Calvario	4:00 pm – 11:00 pm
Holy Wednesday	Jesús Nazareno del Milagro	San Felipe de Jesús	2:50 pm – 10:00 pm
Holy Wednesday	Jesús Nazareno	San Mateo Milpas Altas	4:00 pm – 10:00 pm
Holy Thursday	Jesús Nazareno de la Humildad	San Cristóbal el Bajo	11:00 am – 10:00 pm
Holy Thursday	Jesús Nazareno del Perdón	San Francisco el Grande	1:00 pm 12:00 am
Good Friday	Jesús Nazareno de la Penitencia	La Merced	4:00 am – 3:00 pm
Good Friday	Crucifixion	Antigua Guatemala Cathedral, Escuela de Cristo	12:00 pm – 3:00 pm
Good Friday	Señor Sepultado and Virgen de Soledad	Antigua Guatemala Cathedral	3:00 pm – 1:00 am
Good Friday	Señor Sepultado	San Felipe de Jesús	3:00 pm – 1:00 am
Good Friday	Señor Sepultado	Escuela de Cristo	4:00 pm – 1:00 am

=== Art ===
Antigua is also home to the National Museum of Guatemalan Art, which is housed in the Palace of the Captaincy General, a UNESCO-designated World Heritage Site dating to the 16th century.

=== Education ===
Antigua is known as a destination for people who want to learn Spanish through immersion. There are many Spanish language schools in Antigua, and it is one of the most popular and best recognized centers for studying the Spanish language by students from Europe, Asia, and North America. Language institutes are one of the primary industries of Antigua, along with tourism.

== Sports ==
Antigua football club plays in the Liga Nacional, the top division of Guatemalan football. Their home stadium is the Estadio Pensativo, which has a capacity of 10,000. They are nicknamed Los Panzas Verdes ("Green Bellies") and have been successful nationally, having won the league title five times since 2015.

== In films ==
=== The New Adventures of Tarzan (1935) ===
Film locations for The New Adventures of Tarzan.

In 1935, the film The New Adventures of Tarzan was filmed on location in Guatemala, taking advantage of the help from the United Fruit Company and president Jorge Ubico. The places where the filming was made were:

- Chichicastenango: scenes of a native town where the explorers first met.
- Antigua Guatemala: The Green Goddess temple
- Río Dulce
- Puerto Barrios: arrival and departure of the boats carrying the explorers
- Tikal: jungle scenes
- Quiriguá: Mayan city where they get lectured on the Maya civilization
- Guatemala City: then luxurious Palace Hotel was used to shoot the scenes of the hotel in the imaginary town of At Mantique

=== The Border: 1982 ===
The initial earthquake sequences from the Jack Nicholson film The Border were filmed in Antigua Guatemala, specifically in La Recoleccion Architectural Complex.

== See also ==
- Guatemala City
- List of places in Guatemala
- Tourism in Guatemala

== Notes and references ==
=== Bibliography ===
- Anchisi de Rodríguez, Coralia (13 February 2014). "Sor Juana de Maldonado; reescribiendo su historia". Museo Ixchel, Universidad Francisco Marroquín (in Spanish). Guatemala. Archived from the original on 23 December 2014.
- Antigua Guatemala en línea (n.d.). "Catedral Metropolitana - 1680". antiguaguatemalaonline.com (in Spanish). Archived from the original on 2 February 2015.
- Baily, John (1850). Central America; Describing Each of the States of Guatemala, Honduras, Salvador, Nicaragua, and Costa Rica. London: Trelawney Saunders. Archived from the original on 2023-08-08.
- Cadena, Felipe (1774). Breve descripción de la noble ciudad de Santiago de los Caballeros de Guatemala y puntual noticia de su lamentable ruina ocasionada de un violento terremoto el día veintinueve July 1773 (PDF) (in Spanish). Mixco, Guatemala: Oficina de Antonio Sánchez Cubillas. Archived (PDF) from the original on 2021-07-27.
- Calderón, Carlos (2011). "Parques de Guatemala". Oscar Calderón y fotodocumentalismo (in Spanish). México. Archived from the original on 18 October 2014.
- Conkling, Alfred R. (1884). Appleton's guide to Mexico, including a chapter on Guatemala, and a complete English-Spanish vocabulary. Nueva York: D. Appleton and Company. Archived from the original on 2015-01-23.
- Consejo Nacional para la Protección de la Antigua (n.d.). Guía del Consejo Nacional para la protección de la Antigua (Report) (in Spanish). Guatemala.
- Esparza, José Javier (n.d.). "Navidad, Hispanidad, Identidad". El Manifiesto (in Spanish). Archived from the original on 29 October 2013.
- Foster, Lynn V. (2000). A Brief History of Central America. New York: Facts On File, Inc. ISBN 0-8160-3962-3.
- Fumero, Pedro (11 April 2010). "Genes aborígenes en el Santo Hermano Pedro". El Día (in Spanish). España. Archived from the original on 26 October 2014.
- González Davison, Fernando (2008). La montaña infinita; Carrera, caudillo de Guatemala. Guatemala: Artemis & Edinter. ISBN 978-84-89452-81-7.
- Guatelinda (2014). "La Iglesia del Carmen… otrora esplendorosa y elegante". Mi Guatemala linda en línea (in Spanish). Guatemala. Archived from the original on 19 October 2014.
- Hernández de León, Federico (10 April 1928). "Fenómenos de nuestra historia". Nuestro Diario, Guatemala (in Spanish).
- Hilton, Ronald (n.d.). Who's who in Latin America: A biographical dictionary of notable living men and women of Latin America (3rd ed.). Stanford, California: Stanford University Press.
- Instituto Nacional de Estadística (2002). "XI Censo Nacional de Población y VI de Habitación". INE.gob.gt (in Spanish). Guatemala. Archived from the original on 10 June 2008. "Los datos se refieren al municipio"
- Johnston Aguilar, Rene (2001). "Proyecto arqueológico en el claustro norponiente de la Compañia de Jesús, Antigua Guatemala". Academia (in Spanish). Archived from the original on 10 February 2015.
- Martínez Peláez, Severo [in Spanish] (1990). La patria del criollo; ensayo de interpretación de la realidad colonial guatemalteca (in Spanish). México, D.F.: Ediciones en Marcha.
- Melchor Toledo, Johann Estuardo (November 2011). El arte religioso de La Antigua Guatemala, 1773-1821: Crónica de la emigración de sus imágenes [The religious art of Antigua Guatemala, 1773-1821: Chronicle of the emigration of its images] (PDF) (Doctor en Historia del Arte thesis) (in Spanish). México, D.F.: Universidad Nacional Autónoma de México. Archived (PDF) from the original on 17 December 2014.
- Molina Jiménez (2001). "La Polémica de "El problema (1899)", de Máximo Soto Hall". Revista Mexicana del Caribe (in Spanish). VI (12). Red de Revistas Científicas de América Latina, el Caribe, España y Portugal;Sistema de Información Científica. Archived from the original on 2023-08-08.
- Moncada Maya, J. Omar (2003). "En torno a la destrucción de la Ciudad de Guatemala, 1773. Una carta del Ingeniero Militar Antonio Marín". Biblio 3W. Revista Bibliográfica de Geografía y Ciencias Sociales (in Spanish). VIII (444). Barcelona: Universidad de Barcelona. ISSN 1138-9796. Archived from the original on 23 June 2003.
- Popenoe, Dorothy. 1933. The Story of Antigua Guatemala. Harvard College.
- Mozas Roca, Luis Angel; de León, Irma Yolanda, eds. (2008). Apuntes sobre las obras de rehabilitación del Colegio de la Compañía de Jesús [Notes on the rehabilitation works of the College of the Society of Jesus] (PDF) (in Spanish). Ximena Chapero, design and layout. Guatemala: Agencia Española de Cooperación Internacional para el Desarrollo. Archived (PDF) from the original on 4 June 2014.
- Prins Wilhelm (1922). Between two continents, notes from a journey in Central America, 1920. London, UK: E. Nash and Grayson, Ltd. pp. 148–209.
- Rodríguez Girón, Zoila; Flores, José Alejandro; Garnica, Marlen (1995). Laporte, L.P; Escobedo, H. (eds.). "El real palacio de Antigua Guatemala: arqueología y propuesta de rehabilitación" (PDF). Simposio de Investigaciones Arqueológicas en Guatemala (in Spanish). Guatemala: Museo Nacional de Arquelogía y Etnología. Archived from the original (PDF) on 14 September 2011.
- Santos, Bairon (2011). "Municipio de Ciudad Vieja" (in Spanish). La Tierra. Archived from the original on March 24, 2012.
- Sociedad Estatal Quinto Centenario (1993). Historia general de Centroamérica (in Spanish). España: Sociedad Estatal Quinto Centenario. ISBN 84-86956-28-5.
- Tate Lanning, J. (1977). La Universidad en el Reino de Guatemala (in Spanish). Guatemala: Universitaria.
- "La Antigua Guatemala". Viaje a Guatemala (in Spanish) (Special ed.). Archived from the original on 2 March 2008.
- "Mapa de Antigua Guatemala". Guate4travel (in Spanish). Archived from the original on 24 October 2008.
