= 1773 Guatemala earthquake =

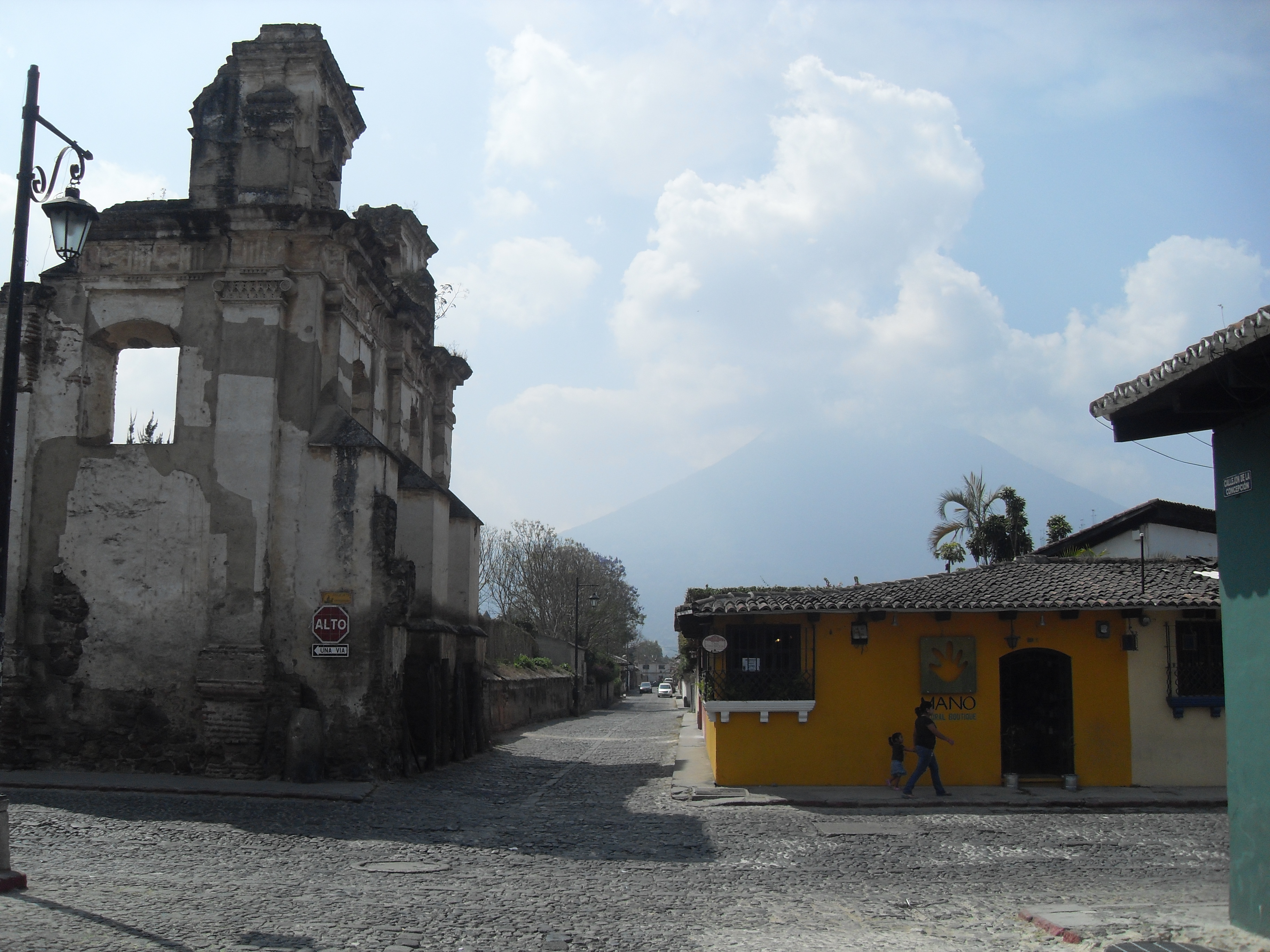
- A damaged convent near Volcán de Agua

- Location within Central America
- Local date: July 29, 1773
- Local time: 15:45
- Magnitude: ~7.5 M_{i}
- Depth: Unknown
- Epicenter: 14.6°N 90.7°W
- Areas affected: At or near Antigua Guatemala
- Max. intensity: MMI VII (Very strong) – MMI VIII (Severe)
- Casualties: 500–600 fatalities

The 1773 Guatemala earthquake struck colonial Guatemala on July 29 at 15:45 local time. It had an estimated epicentral magnitude of 7.5 M_{i}. It was part of a sequence that started in May that year. There were two strong foreshocks on June 11 and the mainshock was followed by numerous aftershocks which lasted until December 1773. The series of all these earthquakes is also referred to as the Santa Marta earthquake(s) as it had started on the feast day of Saint Martha.

With an intensity of approximately VII (Very strong) to VIII (Severe) on the Mercalli intensity scale, the Santa Marta earthquakes destroyed much of Santiago de los Caballeros de Guatemala (modern Antigua Guatemala), which was at that time the colonial capital of Central America. About 500–600 people died immediately and at least another 600 died from starvation and disease as a result of the earthquake. The event had significant impact on the number of religious personnel in the area, especially the Mercedarian Order, with the count reduced almost by half and a similar reduction in the amount of income received.

== Relocation of the capital ==
Spanish authorities had previously considered moving the capital to a different location after the devastation of the 1717 Guatemala earthquake and decided after the 1773 event not to rebuild the city. In 1776 the capital was moved to the new city of Guatemala of Asuncion, known today as Guatemala City.

== See also ==
- List of earthquakes in Guatemala
- List of historical earthquakes
