= Border (disambiguation) =

A border is a geographical boundary.

Border, borders, The Border or The Borders may also refer to:

== Arts, entertainment and media ==
=== Film and television ===
- Border (1997 film), an Indian Hindi-language war film
- Border (2018 Swedish film), a fantasy film
- Border (2026 film), a Hong Kong drama film
- The Border (1982 film), an American drama
- The Border (1996 film), an Italian war drama
- The Border (2007 film), a Finnish-Russian war drama
- The Border (2009 film), a Slovak documentary
- The Border (2008 TV series) a 2008–2010 Canadian drama series
- The Border (2014 TV series), a 2014–2020 Polish crime series

=== Literature ===
- "The Border", a 2004 short story by Richard Harland
- "The Border", a 2019 novel by Don Winslow

=== Music ===
- "Border" (song), by Years & Years, 2015
- "Borders" (Feeder song), 2012
- "Borders" (M.I.A. song), 2015
- "Borders" (The Sunshine Underground song), 2007
- The Border, soundtrack to the 1982 film, by Ry Cooder
- "The Border" (America song), 1983
- "The Border" (Mr. Mister song), 1987
- "The Borders" (song), a 2019 song by Sam Fender
- The Border (album), a 2024 album by Willie Nelson

=== Radio and television broadcasters ===
- ITV Border, previously Border Television, a British television station
- Triple M The Border, a radio station in the Victoria/New South Wales border area, Australia
- WCRQ, The Border, a radio station in Maine, U.S., that spans the U.S. and Canada border

== People ==
- Allan Border (born 1955), Australian cricketer and commentator
- Larry Border (1951–2011), American politician from West Virginia
- Beau Borders (fl. from 2014), American sound engineer
- Gloria Borders (fl. from 1982), American sound editor
- Ila Borders (born 1975), American baseball player
- Lisa Borders (born 1957), American politician and executive
- Michael Borders (born 1946), American muralist
- Pat Borders (born 1963), American baseball player
- William Donald Borders (1913–2010), American archbishop

== Places ==
- Border, Eastern Cape, a region of South Africa
- Border, Utah, U.S.
- Border Village, South Australia
- Parish of Border, New South Wales, Australia
- Border country, or the Anglo-Scottish border
  - Scottish Borders, or The Borders, an area of Scotland
- Border Region, a NUTS statistical region of Ireland
- Border Rural District, a former district of Cumberland, England
- Penrith and The Border (UK Parliament constituency), in England

== Sport ==
- Allan Border Medal, a cricket award in Australia
- Border–Gavaskar Trophy, cricket series between India and Australia, named after the Australian cricketer
- Border Bulldogs, a South African rugby union team
- Border (cricket team), in South Africa
- Border Reivers (rugby union), or The Borders, a Scottish team

== Other uses ==
- Border Group, a sequence of rock strata in southern Scotland
- Borders (retailer), a book and stationery retailer
- Border, part of an Oriental rug
- Border disease, is a viral disease of sheep and goats
- a long and narrow flowerbed, planted with annual, perennials (Herbaceous border)
- Border, a substring of characters that is both a prefix and a suffix of the same string

== See also ==
- Boarder (disambiguation)
- Bordar, ranked below a serf in the social hierarchy of a manor
- Bordeaux (disambiguation)
- Bordure, in heraldry
- Bored (disambiguation)
- Borderline (disambiguation)
- On the Border (disambiguation)
- Republic of Ireland–United Kingdom border, sometimes referred to as the Irish border or British-Irish border
- Border campaign (Irish Republican Army)
- Boundary (disambiguation)
- Bound (disambiguation)
