= Bordeaux (disambiguation) =

Bordeaux is a city in France. It may also refer to:

== Places ==
=== Habitation ===
- Bordeaux Métropole, the intercommunality containing the city
- Roman Catholic Archdiocese of Bordeaux, a religious subdivision surrounding the city of Bordeaux
- University of Bordeaux
- Bordeaux–Mérignac Airport, the airport serving Bordeaux
- Bordeaux, Gauteng, a suburb of Johannesburg in South Africa
- Bordeaux Harbour, a port on the Channel Island of Guernsey
- Bordeaux-Cartierville, a neighbourhood in Ahuntsic-Cartierville in Montreal
- Bordeaux, Limpopo, a town in the Limpopo province of South Africa
- Bordeaux, Nebraska, a community in the United States
- Bordeaux, South Carolina, an unincorporated community in the United States
- Bordeaux, St. John, U.S. Virgin Islands, a community in Saint John, U.S. Virgin Islands
- Bordeaux, St. Thomas, U.S. Virgin Islands, an estate in Saint Thomas, U.S. Virgin Islands
- Bordeaux, Washington, an unincorporated community in the United States
- Bordeaux, Wyoming, an unincorporated community in the United States

=== Geography ===
- Bordeaux (crater), a crater on Mars
- Bordeaux Creek, stream in Dawes County, Nebraska in the United States
- Bordeaux Mountain on the island of Saint John, U.S. Virgin Islands

== Wine ==
- Bordeaux wine, wine grown in the region around Bordeaux
- Bordeaux wine regions, the different AOCs and regions of Bordeaux
- Bordeaux Wine Official Classification of 1855, 19th century classification of Bordeaux wine estates
- Bordeaux mixture, a chemical recipe used to control fungus
- Plan Bordeaux, an initiative intended to avoid surplus wine

== People (real and fictional) ==
- Andrée Bordeaux-Le Pecq (1910–1973), French illustrator
- Edmund Bordeaux Szekely (1905–1979), Hungarian philologist/linguist, philosopher, psychologist
- Henry Bordeaux (1870–1963), French lawyer and writer
- Huon of Bordeaux, a character in an epic French poem
- Joe Bordeaux (1886–1950), American film actor
- Lionel Bordeaux (1940–2022), Native American educator
- Meredith Bordeaux (1912–2014), American politician in the state of Maine
- Nanette Bordeaux (1911–1956), French Canadian-born American film actress
- Richard Bordeaux Parker (1923–2011), American diplomat
- Sasha Bordeaux, a comic book character
- Scarlett Bordeaux (born 1991), American professional wrestler
- Shawn Bordeaux (born 1967), American politician from South Dakota

== Other ==
- Bordeaux mixture, a mixture of copper sulfate and slaked lime used as a fungicide in vineyards, fruit-farms and gardens
- Dogue de Bordeaux, a breed of dog
- FC Girondins de Bordeaux, an association football team in Bordeaux
- LGV Bordeaux-Toulouse, a high-speed rail line
- Bordeaux–Paris, a cycling race
- Fedora (operating system), a Linux-based operating system which was under the codename "Bordeaux"
- Bordeaux, a record album composed by Robin Guthrie of Cocteau Twins and Harold Budd
- Bordelaise sauce, a classic French sauce

== See also ==
- Category:Bordeaux
- Bourdeaux
- Bourdeau
