= Borderline =

Borderline or Border Line may refer to:

== Film and television ==
=== Film ===
- Borderline (1930 film), a Swiss film by Kenneth Macpherson
- Borderline (1950 film), an American film noir starring Fred MacMurray
- Borderline (1980 film), an American film starring Charles Bronson
- Border Line, a 1999 television film starring Sherry Stringfield
- Borderline (2002 film), an American film starring Gina Gershon
- Border Line (film), a 2002 Japanese film by Sang-il Lee
- Borderline (2008 film), a Canadian French-language film directed by Lyne Charlebois
- Border Line, a 2009 film featuring Johnny Ray
- Borderline (2025 film), an American comedy thriller by Jimmy Warden

=== Television ===
- Borderline (2016 TV series), a 2016–2017 British mockumentary television comedy series
- Borderline (2024 TV series), a police procedural television series set on the island of Ireland
- The Borderline (Hong Kong TV series), a 2014 Hong Kong television series
- The Borderline (Canadian TV series), a 2026 Canadian television series
- "Borderline" (Good Girls), a 2018 episode

== Literature ==
- Borderline (magazine), a 2001–2003 comics e-zine
- Borderline (novel), a 2016 novel by Mishell Baker
- Borderline, a 1996 short-story collection by Leanne Frahm
- Borderline, a 2010 novel by Allan Stratton
- Borderline, a 1996 comic book by Carlos Trillo and Eduardo Risso

== Music ==
- Borderline (band), an early-1970s American country rock band

=== Albums ===
- Borderline (Brooks & Dunn album), 1996
- Borderline (Conway Twitty album) or the title song, 1987
- Borderline (Ry Cooder album) or the title song, 1980
- Borderline (EP), by Tove Styrke, or the title song, 2014

=== Songs ===
- "Borderline" (Brandy song), 2020
- "Borderline" (Madonna song), 1984
- "Borderline" (Michael Gray song), 2006
- "Borderline" (The Shooters song), 1988
- "Borderline" (Tove Styrke song), 2014
- "Borderline" (Sunmi song), 2021
- "Borderline" (Tame Impala song), 2019
- "Borderline", by Ariana Grande from Sweetener, 2018
- "Borderline", by Camper Van Beethoven from Key Lime Pie, 1989
- "Borderline", by Cheap Trick from Next Position Please, 1983
- "Borderline", by Chris de Burgh from The Getaway, 1982
- "Borderline", by Ed Sheeran from - (Subtract), 2023
- "Borderline", by Exo-SC from What a Life, 2019
- "Borderline", by Fat White Family from Champagne Holocaust, 2013
- "Borderline", by Jeff Lynne from Armchair Theatre, 2013 remaster
- "Borderline", by Joni Mitchell from Turbulent Indigo, 1994
- "Border Line", by King Krule from 6 Feet Beneath the Moon, 2013
- "Borderline", by Les Emmerson, 1977
- "Borderline", by Man Overboard from Heavy Love, 2015
- "Borderline", by Spirit from Tent of Miracles, 1990
- "Borderline", by Sufjan Stevens, B-side of "The Dress Looks Nice on You", 2004
- "Borderline", by Thin Lizzy from Johnny the Fox, 1976
- "Borderline (An Ode to Self Care)", by Solange from A Seat at the Table, 2016

== Places and structures ==
- Border Line (Switzerland), a series of defensive fortifications constructed in the 1930s
- Borderline Speedway, a dirt-track racing venue in South Australia
- Borderline Bar and Grill, site of the 2018 Thousand Oaks shooting, California, US

== Other uses ==
- Borderline (video game), a 1981 arcade game by Sega
- Borderline personality disorder, a psychiatric condition
- Borderline Theatre Company, a Scottish touring company

== See also ==
- Border (disambiguation)
- Borderliner (Grenseland), a 2017 Norwegian crime drama television series
- Borderliners (De måske egnede), a 1993 novel by Peter Høeg
- Borderlines Film Festival, a British rural film festival
- The Caretakers (1963 film), a film released in the UK as Borderlines
- On the Border (disambiguation)
