= Human response to disasters =

Human response to disasters has been studied through source materials documenting how individuals and societies have interpreted and reacted to catastrophic events. In many ancient times, disasters were often seen through the lens of supernormal explanations.

The term disaster myth refers to common beliefs that disasters typically cause widespread panic, irrational behavior, and social breakdown, despite research that often disputes these assumptions. Proponents of the term further state that people will only act irrationally in the direst of circumstances when terrible danger is imminent and no avenue of escape appears available. They argue that these disaster myths have a negative impact when they cause people, officials, and disaster-relief organizations to make detrimental or incorrect disaster planning and response decisions.

== Panic/Fear ==
Popular accounts of disasters often assume that affected populations will panic and run chaotically. In extreme circumstances, fear can spread rapidly and contribute to disorganized behavior during the evacuation.

However, the opposite is also often observed. Even when experiencing the increased stress from an earthquake, since they arrive unannounced and it is not known when the aftershocks will end, people continue to act rationally. Not only do a few people panic, but most are also unwilling to participate in an organized evacuation. Those who live in the disaster area tend to stay put. The only ones who usually flee are the visitors, tourists, and transients. Disasters also draw people to the area. Some want to help, while others just want to see the destruction.

The general public and organizations involved in emergency planning, management, and response all tend to accept this disaster myth as reality. Panic can cause harm to others if people flee without thought. Staying put can be even worse since the people are not getting away from the disaster's damage and destruction. When necessary, people should evacuate in an orderly manner to avoid disasters. It also provides an opportunity to help others evacuate who may need assistance. The myth of panic can cause officials to be cautious when issuing public bulletins. Researchers have argued that the fear of causing panic can lead officials to delay warnings or withhold information during emergencies. To avoid contributing to or increasing the level of this mythical panic, officials have also chosen not to share information about preparations for some types of disasters (e.g., chemical and biological attacks).

The antithesis of the panic myth was seen with Orson Welles' The War of the Worlds radio broadcast in 1938, the 1942 Cocoanut Grove nightclub fire, and as Hurricane Carla approached the Gulf Coast areas of Texas and Louisiana in 1961. Rational behavior also dominated after earthquakes in Europe, North and South America, and Asia. Despite many reports of widespread panic, evidence later proved otherwise. The myth of panic affecting the official warnings of authorities has been seen in Mexico when the Rio Grande River flooded, in Italy during the flooding of the city of Florence, and after a volcanic eruption in Japan. In the instances when authorities chose to send the military instead of humanitarian organizations in response to Hurricane Katrina, it was in part to help manage and control the perceived panic among the population.

== Shock ==
Many people believe that those who experience a disaster firsthand experience emotional trauma that has both immediate and lasting effects. It is thought that the initial devastation of the disaster leaves people too fragile and in shock. As such, they are unable to cope with their situation or participate in recovery efforts. They are consequently dependent on assistance from outside relief agencies.

Only in a small number of cases does this myth turn out to be true. And, in many cases, the shock is only temporary. What actually happens in most cases is that people react immediately to the disaster and its effects. The disaster can also be a jolt of energy which drives people to respond to the emergency. Those who went through the disaster were the first to engage in relief and rescue efforts before any outside agency. They come together along familiar lines, such as family and friends, and then move as needed to a larger scale involving groups with which they associate (e.g., churches). If the familiar cannot be reached or does not respond, most people turn to faceless law enforcement, welfare, and relief organizations for assistance. People will also seek help outside of their familiar surroundings when special equipment or medical skills are required.

The myth of widespread shock leads outside relief organizations to plan their efforts as if they are the only ones who will be providing assistance. This may create a disconnected rather than a complementary relationship between them and the local agencies. Additionally, the feeling on the part of the survivors that they do not need to rely on outsiders, coupled with the relief organizations believing they are saviors, creates a wall between the two, which in turn inhibits communication, coordination, and effective relief and recovery efforts.

People's reliance on themselves and the well-known was seen in a variety of disaster types, such as the 1953 tornado in Flint-Beecher, Michigan; the 1955 flood of Marysville and Yuba City, California; Hurricane Audrey in 1957; Hurricane Carla in 1961; Hurricane Betsy in 1965; and the 1971 earthquake in San Fernando, California. Both in Mexico City in 1985 and in Turkey in 1999, thousands of local residents banded together to search for fellow victims in the earthquake wreckage. Neighbors performed more than half of the rescue activities after the Great Hanshin-Awaji earthquake hit Kobe City, Japan in 1995.

== Assistance ==
A common disaster myth holds that affected populations are largely passive and dependent on outside assistance. Relief organizations may have assumptions that aid must be provided immediately. Research in disaster studies has often found that immediate assistance is frequently provided by survivors, neighbors, and local responders before outside help arrives. This myth has also been noted in discussions of disasters affecting lower-income countries, where outside aid is sometimes assumed to be the primary source of rescue and relief.

While relief organizations with emergency managers, medical teams, and the like do offer assistance after a disaster, most people are actually saved by other survivors and local authorities, agencies, and organizations.

Because of this myth, more supplies are often sent than the disaster area typically needs. In addition to excess quantity, much of the supplies end up being of little to no use. Relief organizations often do not wait for an assessment of the disaster area and an identification of needs which can be provided by local officials or performed by themselves. As a consequence, money is often wasted on sending unneeded teams of experts or supplies when local authorities and victims would benefit more if that same money was allocated towards providing resources that filled gaps and complemented their efforts. Donors compound the issue by donating used clothing, household items, and the like. With too many supplies on-hand or in possession of supplies they cannot use, local officials are forced to waste manpower and resources on disposing of them. Instead of providing unwanted and unrequested goods, organizations and donors should send money which can be more easily applied to fulfilling local needs.

An example of this myth's impact was seen following the 1993 Hokkaidō earthquake as authorities were forced to spend 1.2 million in U.S. dollars on the removal of unnecessary relief supplies.

== Resources ==
Outside rescue, relief, and recovery agencies almost always miscalculate the amount of available resources for basic needs that are available locally in the aftermath of a disaster. They believe there are not enough materiel, supplies, and personnel for the initial response.

In fact, there are usually enough supplies to last several weeks. Enough food can normally be found in stores, warehouses, and people's homes. Clothing is rarely needed. Medical supplies reside in hospitals, warehouses, or nearby communities. Hospitals as well as police and fire departments, often transition to 24-hour operations. And no evidence is available that proves the unfounded belief that key personnel will leave their posts to go attend to their families and friends.

Relief agencies tend to believe they must act immediately rather than assess the situation first. As a result, they often provide supplies when there is already enough on-site for the immediate future.

== Crime ==
Looting is commonly cited as a typical consequence of disasters, but disaster researchers have argued that its prevalence is often exaggerated in public discourse. Disasters are often assumed to create opportunities for criminal activity because homes and businesses may be damaged, evacuated, or left unguarded. In this view, criminals are thought to take advantage of law enforcement and other agencies being occupied with disaster response and relief efforts. Homes and stores that are evacuated, abandoned, or left unguarded are often assumed to be vulnerable to looting.

While looting can occur, they are always isolated incidents. And much reported looting is either entirely false or, at worst, desperate survivors scavenging for necessities.

But because people believe looting happens, they frequently refuse to leave despite the disaster's destruction and damage in order to protect their homes and property. When no looting occurs, people tend to believe it is because enough security was in place to prevent it rather than looters did not exist in the first place. Also, officials who believe in this myth end up assigning personnel to a protection role rather than to a much more critical rescue, relief, or logistics support function.

The lack of connection between disasters and looting was seen in the rates for theft and burglaries actually falling after Hurricane Betsy in 1965. This myth's impact was also seen outside the United States as evidenced by many Guatemalans staying after the 1976 earthquake out of fear of having their animals, homes, and possessions stolen.

== Morale ==
People tend to believe that survivors are extremely negative after a disaster and need assurance that the outside world cares and the future is bright for themselves and their community.

In fact, people are most often optimistic and have very high morale in a disaster's aftermath. They frequently subordinate any personal feelings of loss and suffering in order to apply themselves to providing food, shelter, and other services to those in need. Their motivation to help one another boosts the sense of community and togetherness.

Because of the myth, dignitaries and officials feel the need to come to the disaster area to reassure the survivors. They often make promises of aid that either are not kept or do not happen in a timely manner. This can cause survivors to resent outsiders. This resentment in turn can prevent the survivors from asking for needed skills and resources that the outsiders can in fact provide.

== Disease ==
When a disaster results in deaths, especially in large quantities, people often believe they are at considerable risk of catching a disease from them. They also believe disease epidemics develop in the wake of disasters.

The fact that they died from the disaster does not make them a risk for spreading diseases. If a body does carry a communicable disease, the person already had it when he or she was alive. The fact that the body is now stationary and will remain in one place makes it less of a risk than prior to death. And an epidemic would happen only if either of two circumstances exist: 1) the disaster brings disease with it for which the people are not immune or 2) the disaster's effects lead to malnutrition, which increases susceptibility to disease, and finally, a large number of people contract the disease.

The belief in the myth can result in the hurried disposal of the bodies without proper identification, burial, or involvement by the next of kin. This can add to the suffering of survivors because they were not allowed to properly care for their loved ones. In addition to the personal toll, needlessly disposing of dead bodies can divert personnel and supplies from other areas where at that time they are needed more (e.g. involved in actions that benefit those still living). Fear or rumor of an epidemic can also cause relief organizations to provide medicines, resources, and other aid for a problem that does not exist.

This myth has been repeated many times such as in the 1972 earthquake in Managua, Nicaragua, Hurricane Mitch in 1998, the 1999 earthquake in Turkey, and the 2000 flooding in Mozambique. Additionally, rumors of hepatitis, measles, dysentery, and typhus that were later proven to be false followed the 1976 earthquake in Guatemala.

== Perpetuation of myths ==
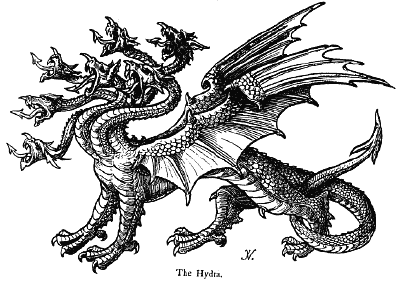
Hydra

=== By people ===
People who have experienced a disaster often believe the dramatic accounts of their own suffering. It allows them to pass off their actions as atypical and daring. In the process of telling others about their involvement, the exaggerated component of their story is spread along with the reality.

Disaster survivors tend to worry about looting. Their increased anxiety can cause them to spread reports whether they definitely know of any or not. While most people who are asked admit to not having personally witnessed or experienced looting, many claim of being aware of it elsewhere. The belief in looting can make people jump to the conclusion that looting was the cause of items going missing before considering the disaster may have moved, buried, or destroyed them.

=== By organizations ===
Government agencies, civilian organizations, and first responders may also believe in disaster myths to some extent. Researchers have argued that disaster myths can persist not only among the general public but also among emergency planners and response professionals. When these assumptions are built into planning and response systems, they may shape decisions about warnings, security, aid, and communication during disasters.

An example of how organizations can perpetuate disaster myths takes place in the days following a disaster and up until official numbers are compiled. During this time, officials from emergency, relief, rescue, and welfare organizations can overestimate the loss of life and destruction of property. This sheds a more positive light on their organizations since they can point to effective emergency procedures and local heroism as the reason their figures turned out to be higher than the actual numbers. If their calculations end up being lower than the official figures, they might be blamed for incompetence and inefficiency.

Although the inability to cope by a disaster-site's community and people is a myth, it continues to be believed. One reason is the justification relief agencies give while promoting the assistance they provide. They feel they are needed because they believe facilities such as hospitals, police and fire departments, and other local first responders do not have the capacity to meet the sheer demand from a disaster. And if their efforts do not go as planned, they often point to survivors' irrationality rather than reassess the assumptions on which they developed their relief plans.

Local, regional, and national officials make up a primary source of information for the media. In the self-imposed small window the media has to get out the latest details of the disaster, fact-checking sometimes suffers and they rely solely on the officials' accuracy. Consequently, officials substantially influence the media's portrayal and what viewers, listeners, and readers see. An example of this is seen in officials highlighting the positives within their own organization's efforts while downplaying the information from and activities by unofficial groups and sources.

When asked by the media, law enforcement officials frequently say they are taking sufficient action to prevent looting even if they have taken no action on the issue. If the norm happens and little to no looting occurs, they may be credited for the absence of crime. But if the exception to the rule happens, they do not want to be blamed for not protecting against the looting. Whether it is true or not, people believe local law enforcement is out keeping the area secure from looters and the myth continues to propagate.

=== By media ===
Many myths are perpetuated by the mass media including newspapers, television, radio, and internet news. This is largely due to the way they portray disasters. In fact, most people base their opinions and beliefs regarding disasters and survivor behavior on what they see in the media. The media strives to keep their viewers' and readers' attention for as long as possible. Drama and destruction is interesting and compelling; most of everything else is secondary. For the most part, the media, regardless of country, takes a fairly standard approach to disaster coverage and reporting. Immediately after the disaster, they rely on statistics of destruction and damage followed by stories of victims and those providing the rescue and relief. The media repeatedly moves away from discussing the disaster as a whole to focusing on individual parts and the drama involved in them. As a result of its manner in covering disasters, the media may capture only pieces instead of the entire event while emphasizing the unusually audacious or unusually tragic incidents.

A main focus of media coverage centers on emergency management organizations performing rescue and relief actions in the disaster area. The media frequently portrays international relief teams as superstars saving the victims from the disaster's destruction while simultaneously implying the local officials are negligent, inept, or corrupt. Within this backdrop, the portrayal of a breakdown in society and social behavior is more likely to appear in coverage of disasters occurring outside the United States. An example of this type of portrayal that helps perpetuate disaster myths involves the frequent reports of people panicking in both small and large numbers to the point of fleeing when faced by an oncoming disaster such as a hurricane.

Additionally, when the international media noticed few stories of looting coming out of Japan following the Great East Japan Disaster in 2011, they generally remarked on how well the Japanese people behave. By believing in this myth, they assumed the Japanese showed more behavioral control than other societies rather than understanding it rarely happens in association with any disaster.

== Bibliography ==
- Aptekar, Lewis. Environmental Disasters in Global Perspective. New York: G.K. Hall & Co., 1994.
- de Goyet, Claude de Ville. "Stop Propagating Disaster Myths." The Lancet, 356, no. 9231 (August 26, 2000): 762–764.
- Drury, John, David Novelli, and Clifford Stott. “Psychological disaster myths in the perception and management of mass emergencies: Psychological disaster myths.” Journal of Applied Social Psychology, 43 (2013): 2259–2270.
- Goltz, James D. "Are the News Media Responsible for the Disaster Myths? A Content Analysis of Emergency Response Imagery." International Journal of Mass Emergencies and Disasters 2, no. 3 (1984): 345–368.
- Nogami, Tatsuya, and Fujio Yoshida. "Disaster myths after the Great East Japan Disaster and the effects of information sources on belief in such myths." Disasters 38, no. Supp 2 (2014): S190-S205.
- Quarantelli, E.L., and Russel R. Dynes. “When Disaster Strikes (It Isn't Much Like What You've Heard & Read About).” Psychology Today (February 1972): 67–70.
