= On the Border (disambiguation) =

On the Border is a 1974 album by the Eagles.

On the Border may also refer to:

== Music ==
- On the Border (song), a song by Al Stewart about the Spanish Civil War, from the album Year of the Cat (album).

== Film and television ==
- On the Border (film), a 1930 American drama
- On the Border (1998 film), an American TV film starring Casper Van Dien
- On the Border (Armenian TV series), a 2015 action drama
- On the Border (South Korean TV series), or Those Who Cross the Line, a 2018–2021 South Korean TV series

== Other uses ==
- On the Border Mexican Grill & Cantina, an American and South Korean restaurant chain
- On the Border, a 2005 book by Michel Warschawski
- Rajalla ('On the Border'), a 1930s Finnish poem collection by L. Onerva
- "On the Border", a song by Al Stewart on the 1976 album Year of the Cat
- Frederiksberg Kommunale Funktionærers Boligforening, or "Ved Grænsen" ('On the Border'), a Danish area of houses

== See also ==
- Borderline (disambiguation)
- Border (disambiguation)
- Borderline personality disorder, a mental illness
- "On the Borderline", a 2003 single by Bec Cartwright
