= La Recolección Architectural Complex =

Convent and Church of the order of the Recollects
- Iglesia y convento de La Recolección (Spanish)
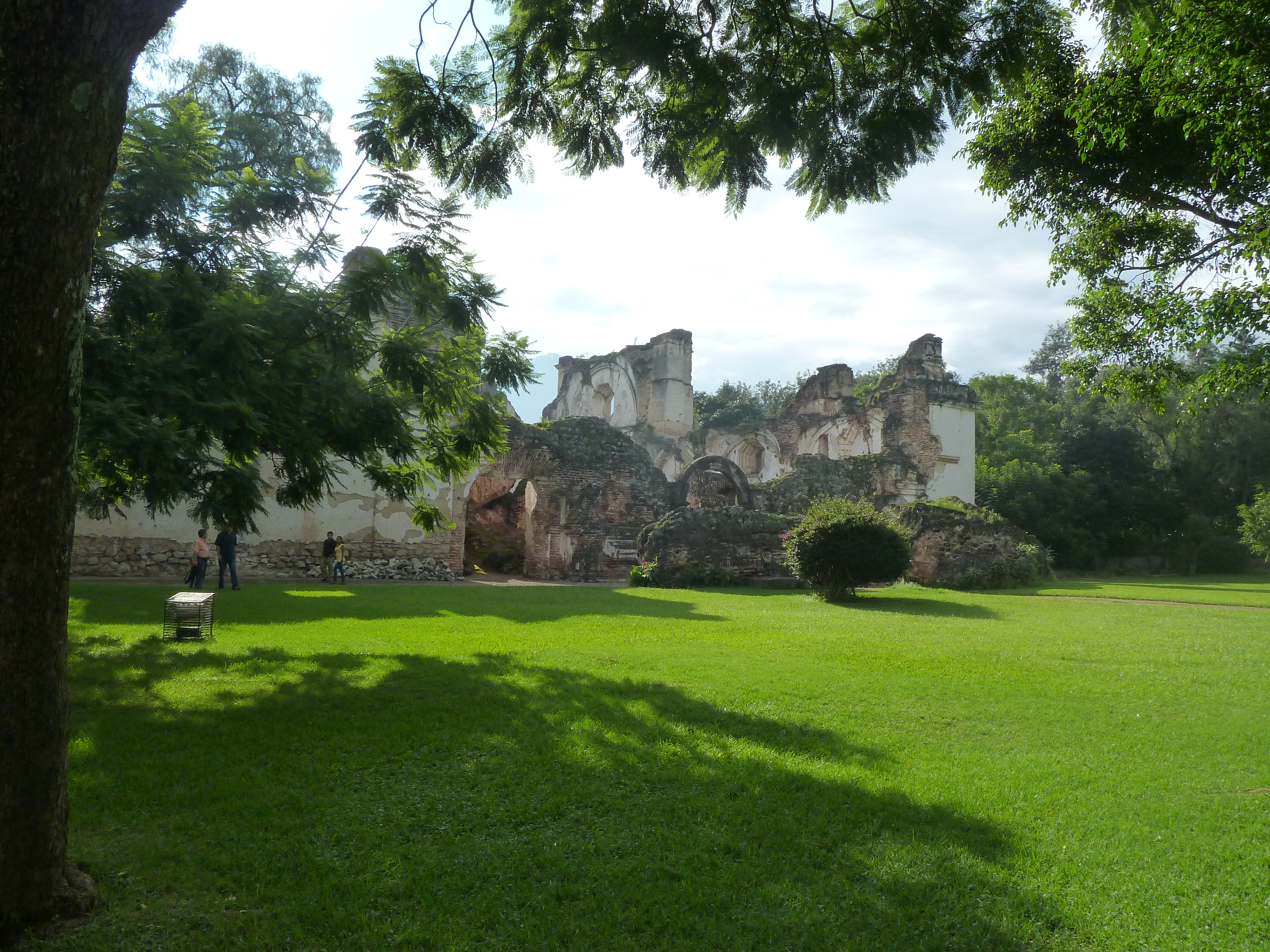
- View of the park and remnants of the church at La Recolección Architectural Complex

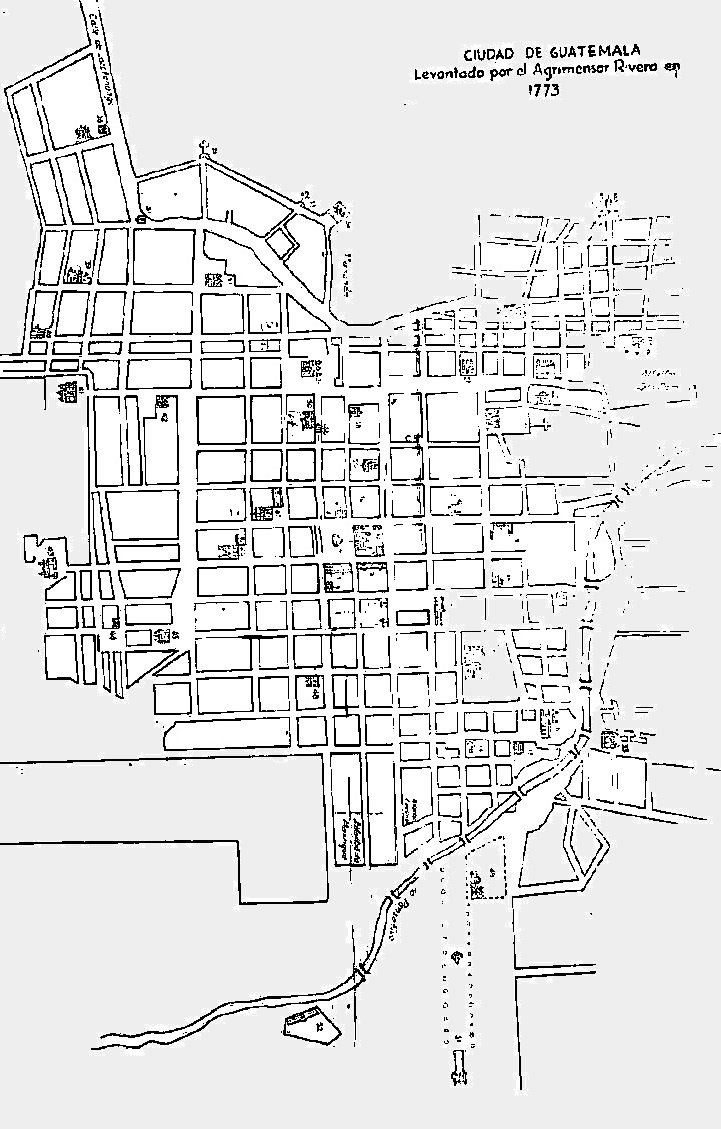
- Location within Antigua Guatemala

General information
- Architectural style: Spanish seismic baroque
- Location: Antigua Guatemala, Guatemala
- Coordinates: 14°33′38″N 90°44′28″W
- Construction started: 1701
- Completed: May 23, 1717
- Destroyed: 1751 earthquake; Santa Marta earthquake in 1773; 1917 Guatemala earthquake; 1976 Guatemala earthquake
- Owner: Consejo Nacional Para la Protección de La Antigua Guatemala

La Recolección Architectural Complex is a former church and monastery of the Order of the Recollects (Ordo Fratrum Minorum Recollectorum) and its adjacent park in Antigua, Guatemala. It is in the western part of the old city.

== History ==
In 1685 two missionaries of the friars of the Recollects arrived, and, with more friars arriving in subsequent years, the City Council was asked for permission to build a monastery. In their 1695 report, the City Council opined that not enough friars were there to support this enterprise and that enough monasteries had already been established. Nevertheless, in 1700 a royal decree was issued for the building of the monastery. In 1701 construction of buildings commenced, followed six years later by the laying of the cornerstone for the Church itself. In 1708 the cloisters, library, and infirmary were completed. The church was inaugurated on May 23, 1717.

A few months later Antigua was afflicted by the 1717 earthquakes damaging the church and the cloisters. After repairs, the monastery housed 35 friars in 1740. The complex suffered again in the 1751 earthquakes and more so in the devastating Santa Marta earthquakes of 1773. The church lost its base wall and most of the presbytery and the crossing, while the aisles, choir and its upper side were render useless.

Throughout the years, man-made destruction further demolished the complex, as remnants were used as a stable, as a soap factory, and as a sport complex. Materials were also removed for outside construction.

== Today ==
Today the ruins are surrounded by parkland; they are a protected national monument. Large masses of masonry are found, mainly inside the church. There is public access to the cloisters; there is no access to the catacombs.

== In film ==
The initial earthquake sequences from the Jack Nicholson's film The Border were filmed in Antigua Guatemala, specifically in La Recoleccion.

== Gallery ==
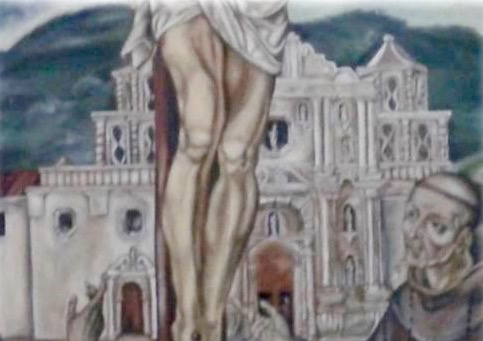
18th Century painting that shows La Recolección church in the background.

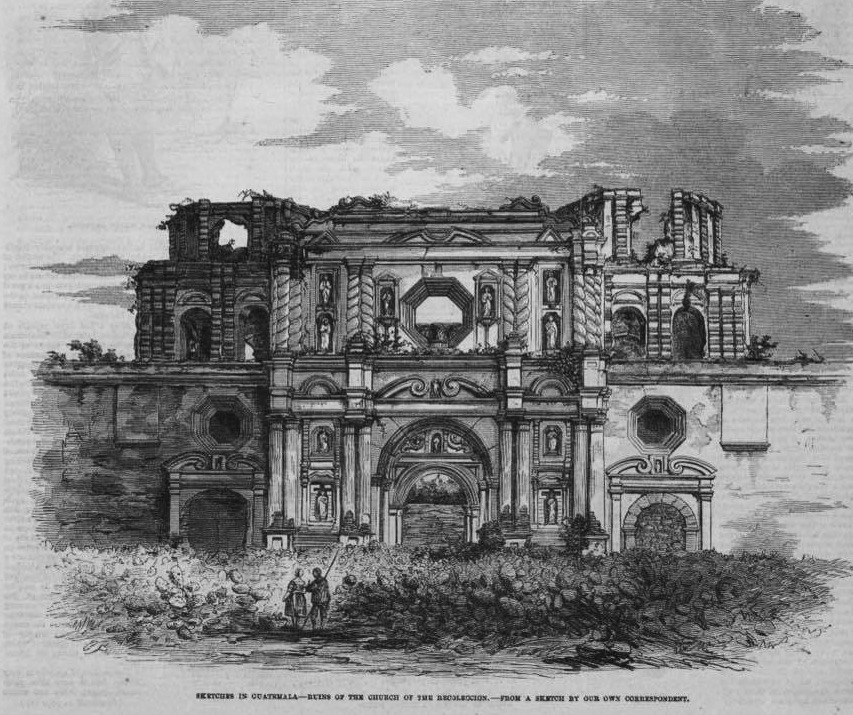
Sketch from the ca. 1840. Notice how the façade had survived the earthquakes relatively well.

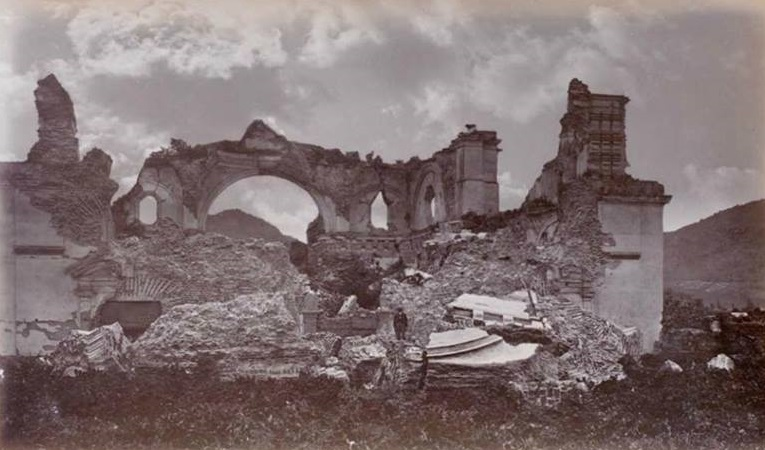
Ruins of La Recoleccion in 1875. The only surviving arch was a symbol of Antigua Guatemala ruins until it was ultimately destroyed by the earthquakes of 1918 and 1976.

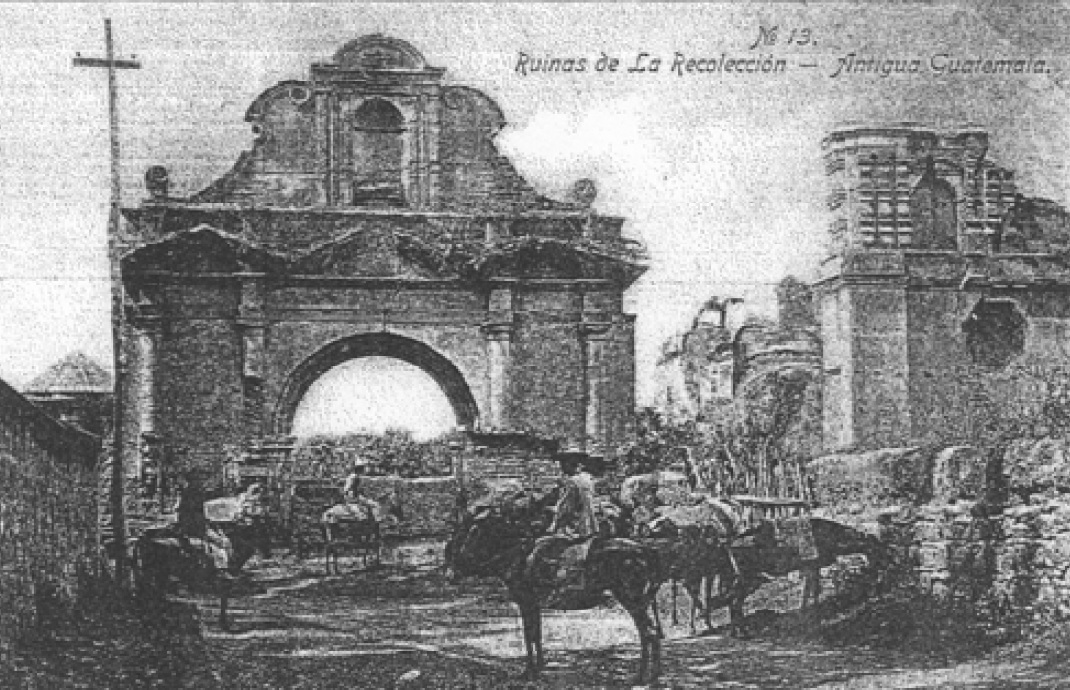
Condition the complex was in towards the end of the 19th century.

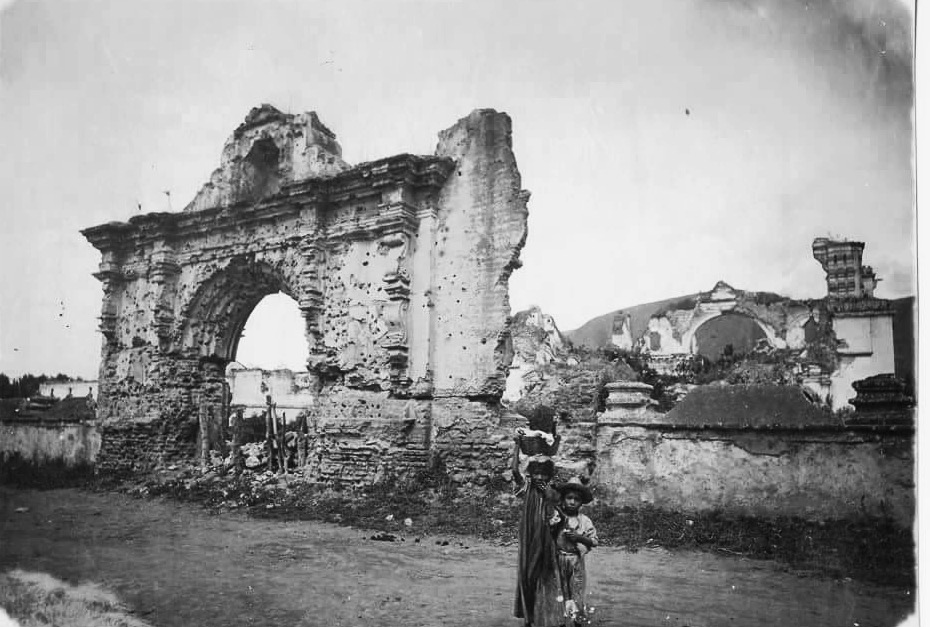
Ruins in the early 20th century.

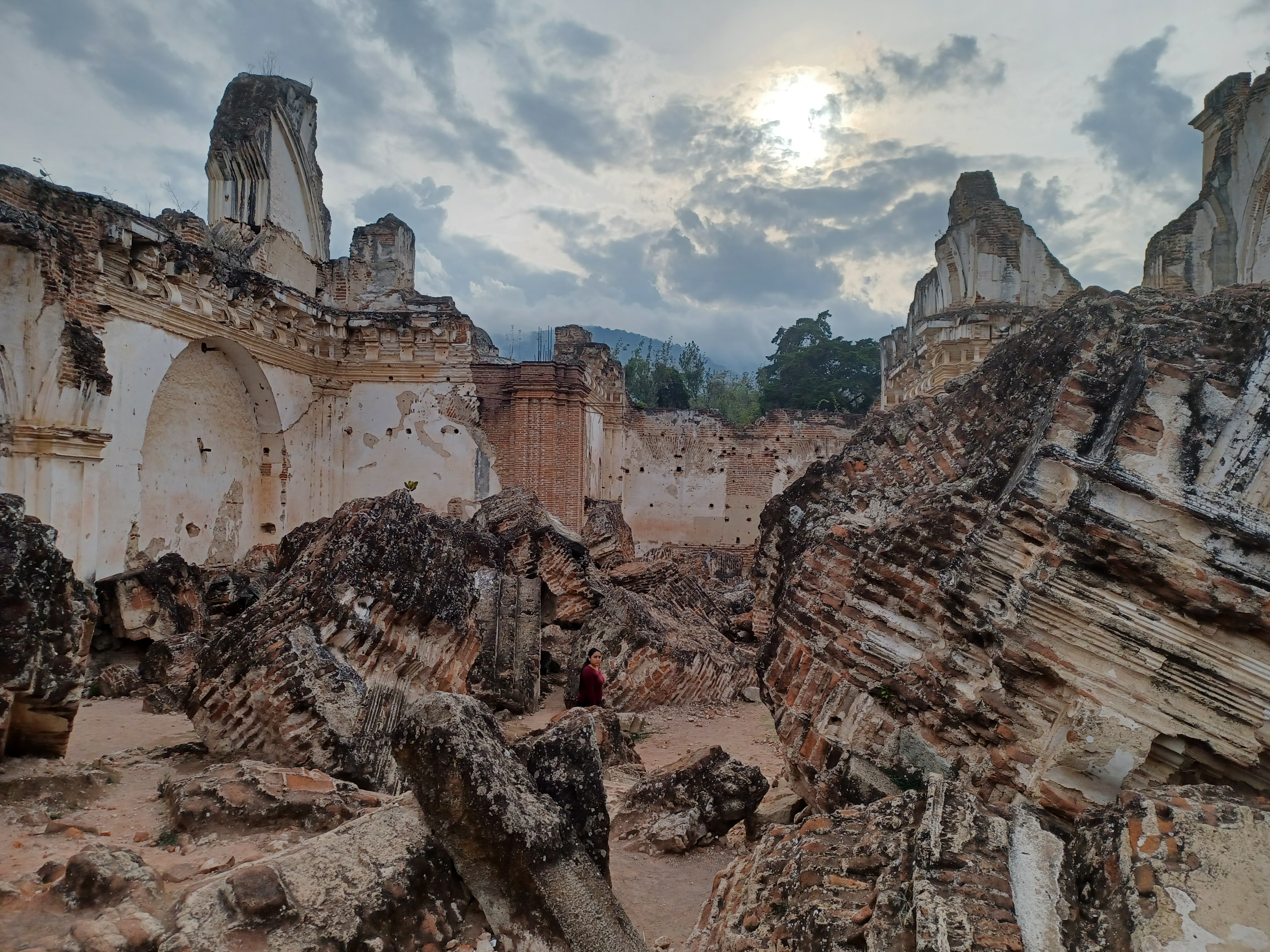

== See also ==
- 1773 Guatemala earthquake
- List of places in Guatemala

== Notes and references ==
=== Bibliography ===
- Antigua Guatemala online (2004). "Arquitectos de Antigua Guatemala". antiguaguatemalaonline.com (in Spanish). Archived from the original on 15 May 2004.
- Cadena, Felipe (1774). Breve descripción de la noble ciudad de Santiago de los Caballeros de Guatemala y puntual noticia de su lamentable ruina ocasionada de un violento terremoto el día veintinueve de julio de 1773 (PDF) (in Spanish). Mixco, Guatemala: Oficina de Antonio Sánchez Cubillas.
- Melchor Toledo, Johann Estuardo (2011). "El arte religioso de la Antigua Guatemala, 1773-1821; crónica de la emigración de sus imágenes" (PDF). Tesis doctoral en Historia del Arte (in Spanish). México, D.F.: Universidad Nacional Autónoma de México. Archived from the original (PDF) on 17 December 2014.
