= Mishell Baker =

American fantasy writer

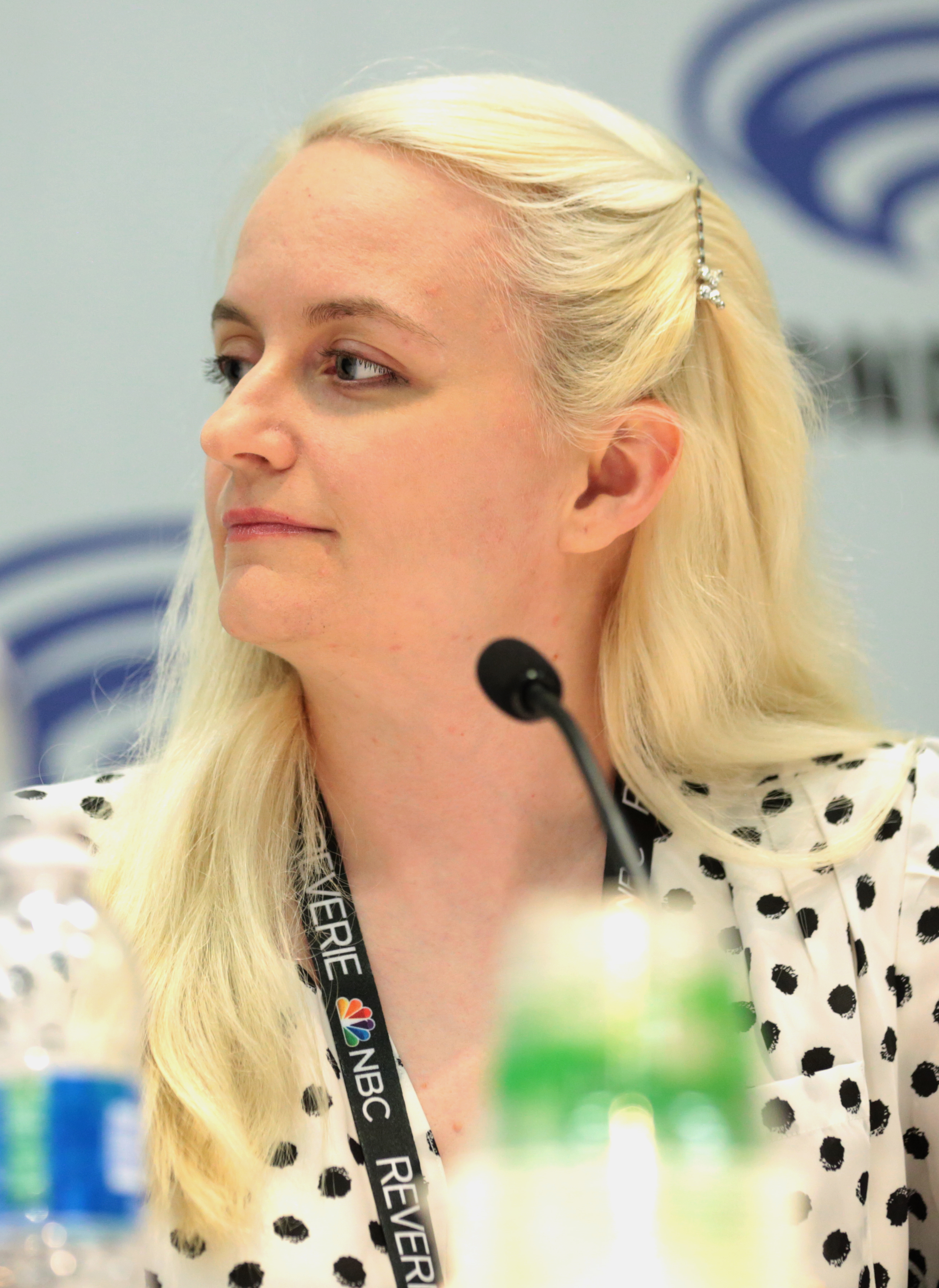
- Baker in March 2018
- Born: 1976 (age 49–50)
- Occupations: Novelist, short story writer
- Children: 2
- Writing career
- Period: 2009–present
- Genre: fantasy
- Website: mishellbaker.com

Mishell Baker (born 1976) is an American writer of fantasy. A 2009 graduate of the Clarion Workshop, her fantasy stories have been published in Daily Science Fiction, Beneath Ceaseless Skies, and Electric Velocipede.

== Overview ==
In 2016, Baker published Borderline, the first novel in the Arcadia Project urban fantasy series with Simon & Schuster's imprint Saga Press (edited by Navah Wolfe). It was a Publishers Weekly staff pick, and Barnes & Noble chose it as one of the best science fiction and fantasy novels of 2016. Borderline is notable for having a disabled protagonist with borderline personality disorder.

The second and third books in the series, Phantom Pains and Impostor Syndrome, were released in 2017 and 2018 respectively.

== Biography ==
Mishell Baker lives in Los Angeles, California with her partner and two children.

In November 2022, Baker was diagnosed with metastatic appendix cancer and placed on palliative chemotherapy.

== Novels ==
The Arcadia Project

1. Borderline, March 2016, ISBN 9781508225263
2. Phantom Pains, March 2017, ISBN 9781481451925
3. Impostor Syndrome, March 13, 2018 ISBN 9781481451949

== Awards and nominations ==
=== Borderline ===
- Nominated for the 2016 Nebula Award for Best Novel.
- Included on the 2016 James Tiptree Jr. Award Honor List.
- Nominated for the 2017 World Fantasy Award—Novel.

=== The Arcadia Project trilogy ===
The trilogy taken as a whole was a finalist for the Mythopoeic Award.
