= Boarder =

Boarder may refer to:

== Persons ==
A boarder may be a person who:

- snowboards
- skateboards
- bodyboards
- surfs
- stays at a boarding house
- attends a boarding school
- takes part in a boarding attack

== Other uses ==
- The Star Boarder, a 1914 American short comedy film
- The Strange Boarder, a lost 1920 American silent drama film.
- The Boarder (1953 film), a 1953 Soviet drama film
- Boarders (TV series), a BBC comedy TV show

== See also ==
- Board (disambiguation)
- Border (disambiguation)
- Bus boarder
