= Bordeaux, U.S. Virgin Islands =

Coordinates: 18°20′07″N 64°43′15″W

Bordeaux is a neighborhood on the island of Saint John in the United States Virgin Islands. It is named for Mount Bordeaux, the highest point on the island. Most of this area is part of Virgin Islands National Park.
