= 1976 Guatemala earthquake =

February 1976 earthquake in Guatemala

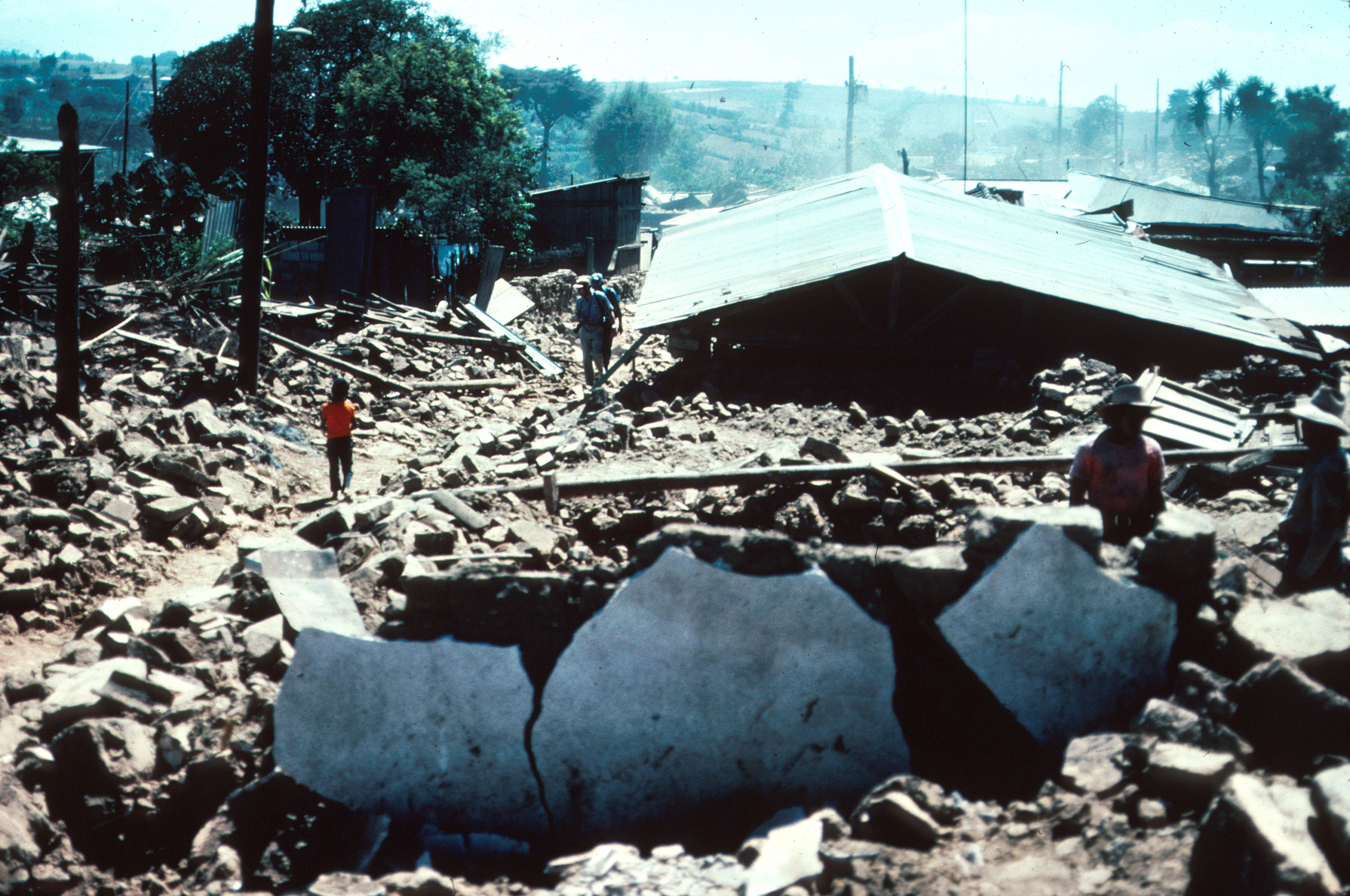

- UTC time: 1976-02-04 09:01:46
- ISC event: 717474
- USGS-ANSS: ComCat
- Local date: February 4, 1976
- Local time: 03:01:43
- Magnitude: 7.5 M_{w}
- Depth: 5 kilometres (3 mi)
- Epicenter: 15.32°N 89.10°W
- Fault: Motagua Fault
- Type: Strike-slip
- Areas affected: Guatemala; Belize; Honduras; El Salvador
- Max. intensity: MMI IX (Violent)
- Casualties: 23,000 fatalities, 76,000 injured

The 1976 Guatemala earthquake struck on February 4 at 03:01:43 local time with a moment magnitude of 7.5. The shock was centered on the Motagua Fault, about 160 km northeast of Guatemala City at a depth of 5 kilometers (3.1 mi) near the town of Los Amates in the department of Izabal.

The earthquake ruptured a continuous length of 240 km along the Motagua fault and might have extended further to the east and west but was blocked by vegetation and swamps.

Cities throughout the country suffered damage, and most adobe type houses in the outlying areas of Guatemala City were destroyed. The earthquake struck during the early morning (at 3:01 am, local time) when most people were asleep. This contributed to the high death toll of 23,000. Approximately 76,000 were injured, and many thousands left homeless. Some of the areas affected went without electricity and communications for days.

The main shock was followed by thousands of aftershocks, some of the larger ones causing additional damage and loss of life.

== Seismic data ==
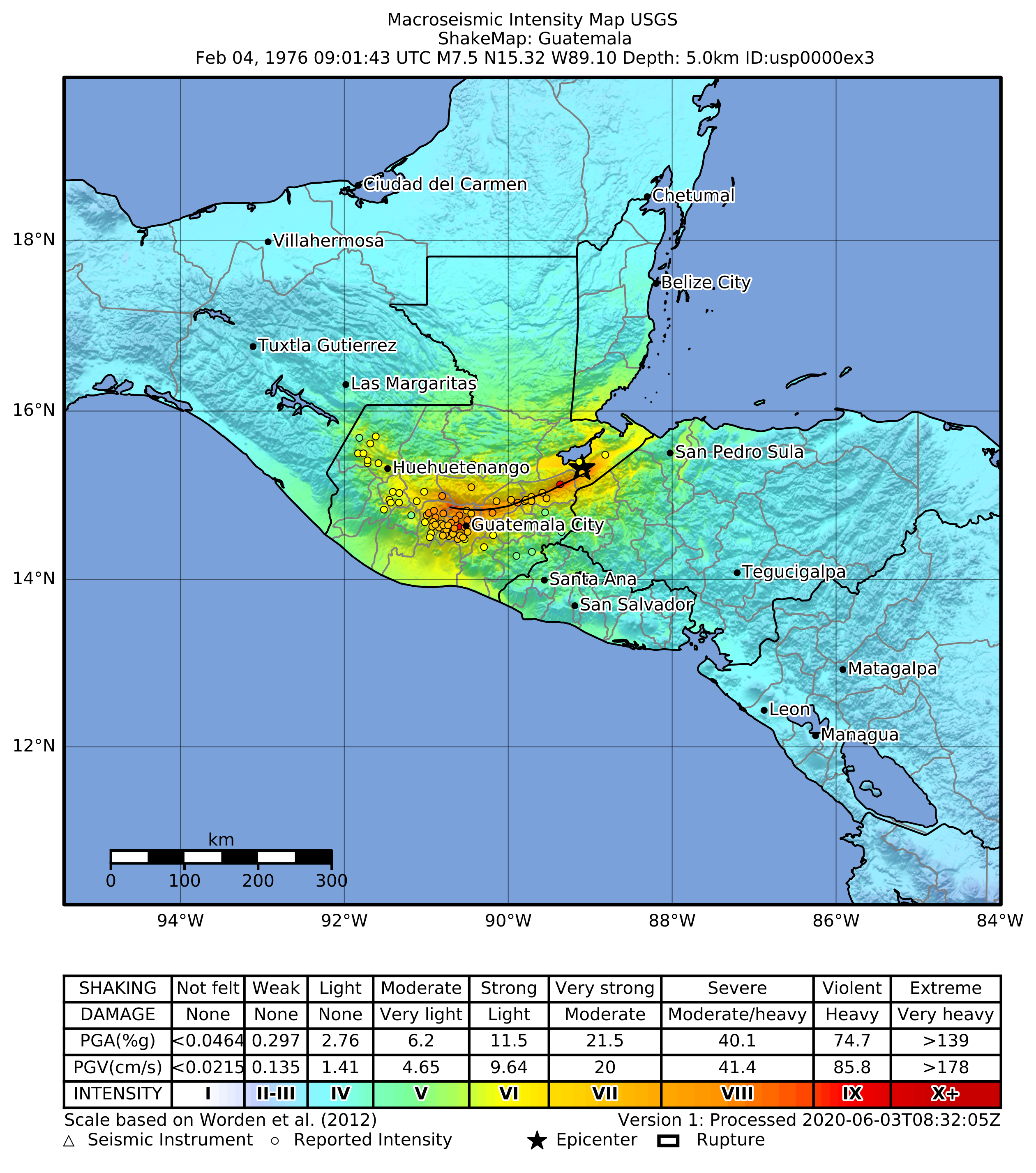
Earthquake shakemap provided by USGS

The quake's epicentre was located near the town of Los Amates, in the eastern part of the Motagua Fault, a left-lateral strike-slip fault that forms part of the tectonic boundary between the North American plate and the Caribbean plate. Ground shaking was felt during approximately 39 seconds, and caused visible rupturing over 230 kilometres (143 mi) along the Motagua fault, while the inferred length of faulting—based on aftershock registration—was estimated at 300 kilometres (186 mi). Average horizontal displacement along the Motagua fault was 100 centimetres (3 ft) with a maximum displacement of 326 centimetres (11 ft).

Maximum seismic intensity (MMI IX) was located in the Mixco area, some sections of Guatemala City, Gualán and San Martín Jilotepeque. A seismic intensity of MM VI covered an area of 33,000 km^{2}. Soil liquefaction and sand boils were observed in several locations with high seismic intensity. The main quake activated secondary fault zones, including the Mixco fault, located in a densely populated area just north-west of Guatemala City.

== Victims and damage ==
The most heavily affected area covered some 30,000 km^{2}, with a population of 2.5 million. In addition to the 23,000 reported fatalities and injuries to 77,000 people, approximately 258,000 houses were destroyed, leaving about 1.2 million people homeless. 40% of the national hospital infrastructure was destroyed, while other health facilities also suffered substantial damage.

== International reaction ==
Immediately after the earthquake, President Kjell Eugenio Laugerud García invited most of the foreign ambassadors to tour the affected regions by helicopter, which prompted them to quickly ask for help in their home countries. For example, the United States of America rebuilt most of the roads, and Canada and Belgium each rebuilt a village.

Within days of the initial rupture, the USGS sent a team of geologists to document the fault rupture and its effects. This team, headed by George Plafker, traveled the entire length of the fault by helicopter and was able to clearly trace its location. During this expedition, several thousand photographs were collected including 1:10,000 aerial photographs collected by plane.

In 2021, this analog data was digitized and georeferenced in order to build a database to assist in relocating the initial rupture location. During the summer of 2021, a team of geologists successfully relocated the fault rupture at 10 different locations. At these locations, no evidence of post-1976 fault creep was observed.

== Aftershocks ==
Several aftershocks, ranging from 5.2 to 5.8 M_{w} caused additional casualties and hampered relief efforts.

Date	Origin Time	Coordinates	Location	Depth	Magnitude
Feb. 04 1976	09.30.28.3	14.7°N 90.6°W	7 km NNE of Mixco	5 km	5.8 M_{w}
Feb. 06 1976	04.11.03.3	14.6°N 91.1°W	6 km SSE of San Lucas Tolimán	5 km	4.8 M_{w}
Feb. 06 1976	18.11.59.2	14.3°N 90.2°W	11 km ENE of Cuilapa	5 km	5.2 M_{w}
Feb. 06 1976	18.19.17.7	14.7°N 90.6°W	5 km ENE of San Pedro Sacatepéquez	5 km	5.8 M_{w}
Feb. 08 1976	08.13.51.9	15.7°N 88.5°W	13 km SE of Puerto Barrios	5 km	5.7 M_{w}
Feb. 09 1976	11.44.46.7	15.3°N 89.1°W	30 km WSW of Morales	5 km	5.1 M_{w}
Feb. 10 1976	06.17.43.0	15.0°N 89.7°W	18 km WNW of Zacapa	5 km	4.7 M_{w}
Mar. 07 1976	02.54.05.4	14.9°N 90.9°W	14.5 km SW of Joyabaj	5 km	4.8 M_{w}
Mar. 07 1976	03.15.40.3	14.7°N 90.5°W	Chinautla (9 km North of Guatemala City)	5 km	4.9 M_{w}

Source: Wayerly Person, William Spence, and James W. Dewey. Main event and principal aftershocks from teleseismic data. In: Guatemalan Earthquake of February 4, 1976, A Preliminary Report.

== In popular culture ==
Scenes of the earthquake's aftermath, filmed on February 6, 1976, were featured in the Italian Mondo film Savana violenta, directed by Antonio Climati and Mario Morra.

== Image gallery ==
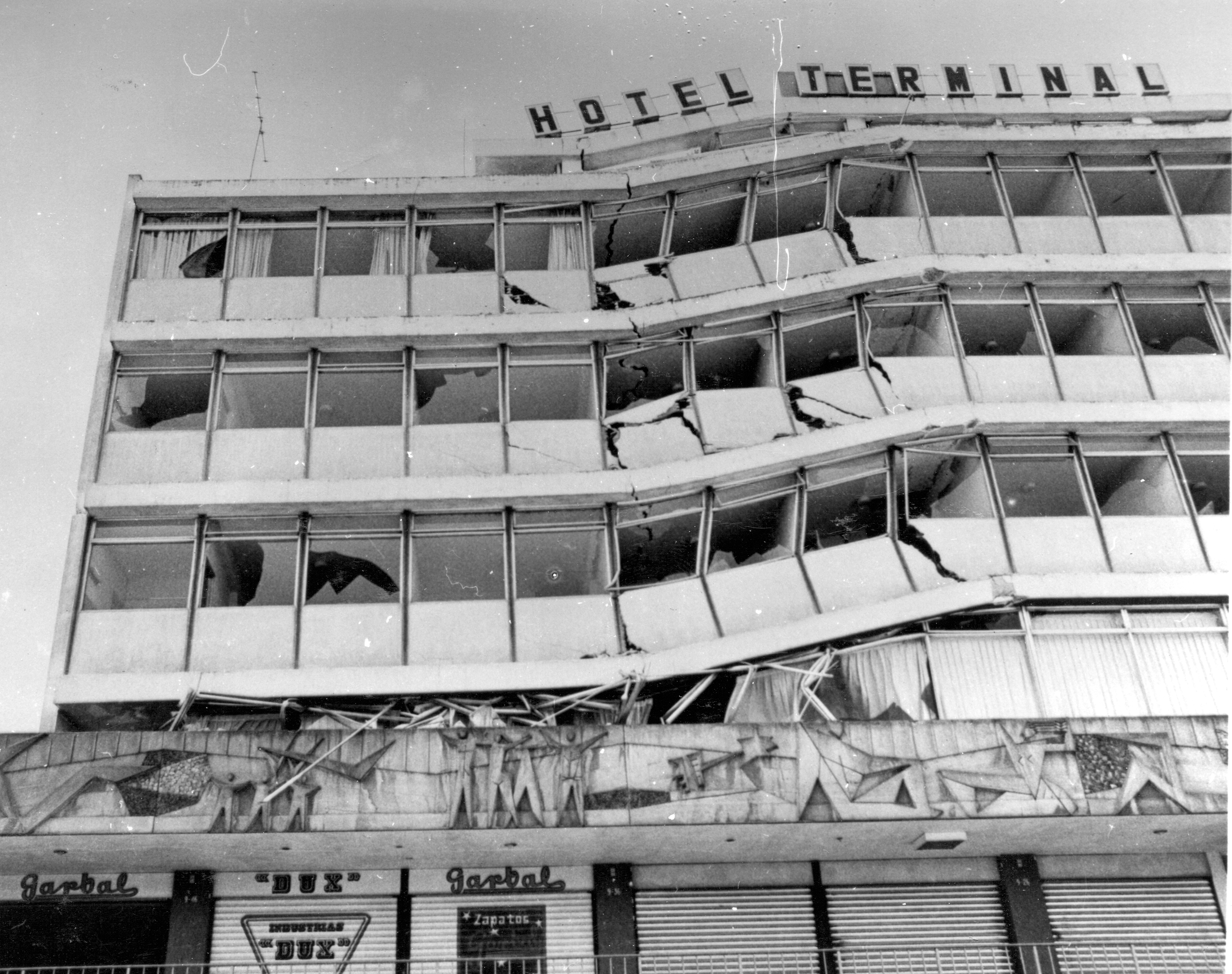
Hotel Terminal

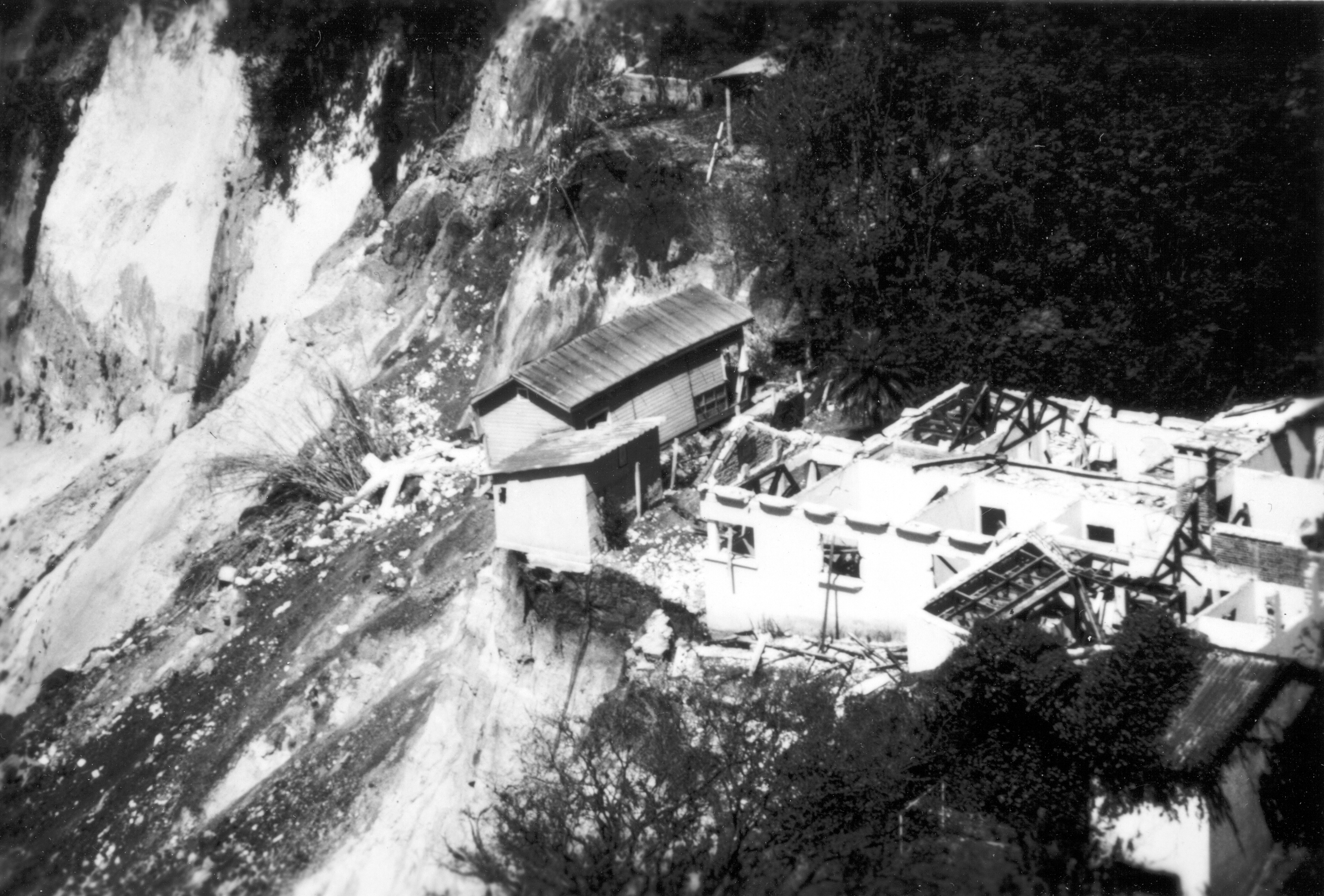
Landslide in Guatemala City

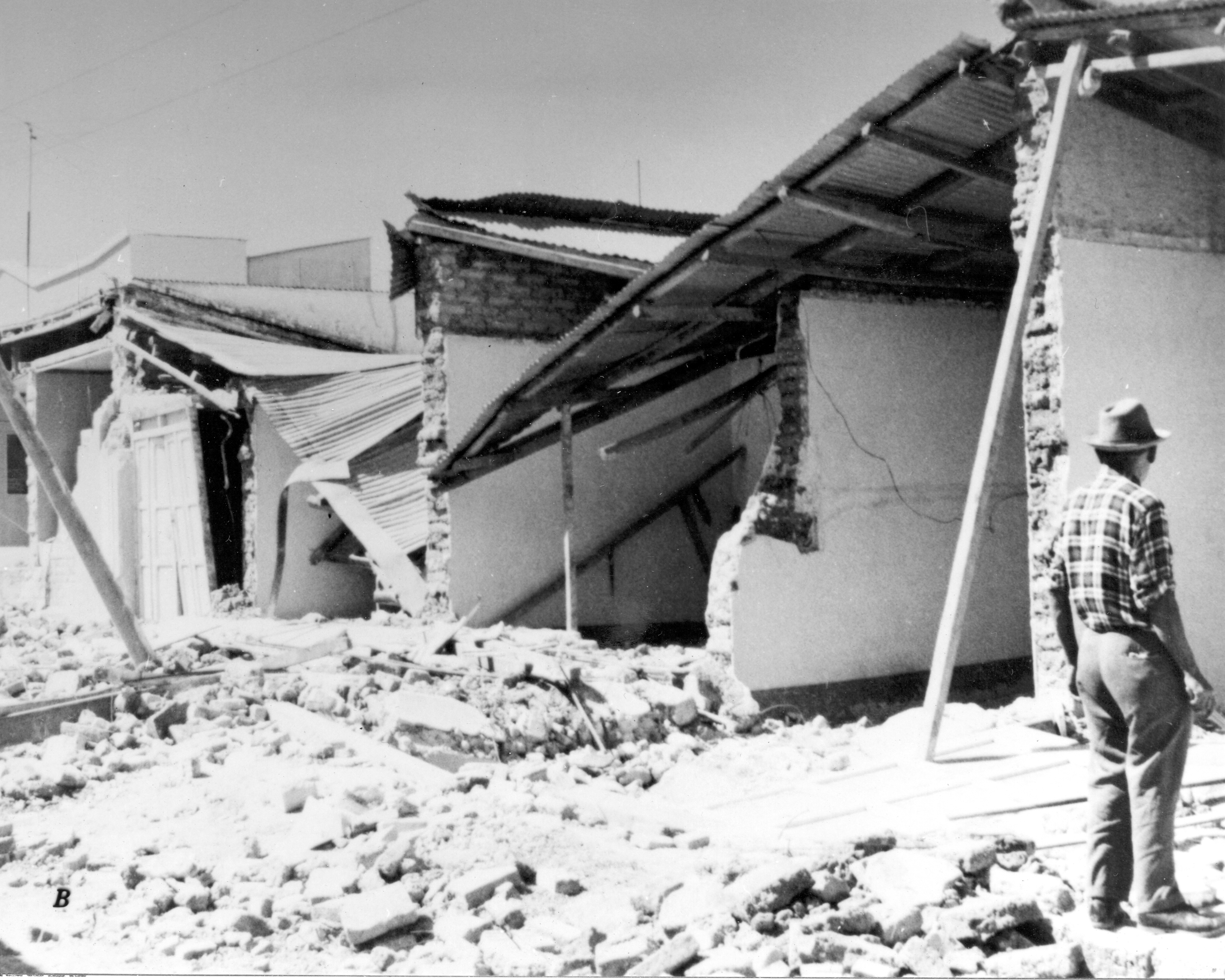
Guatemala City centre
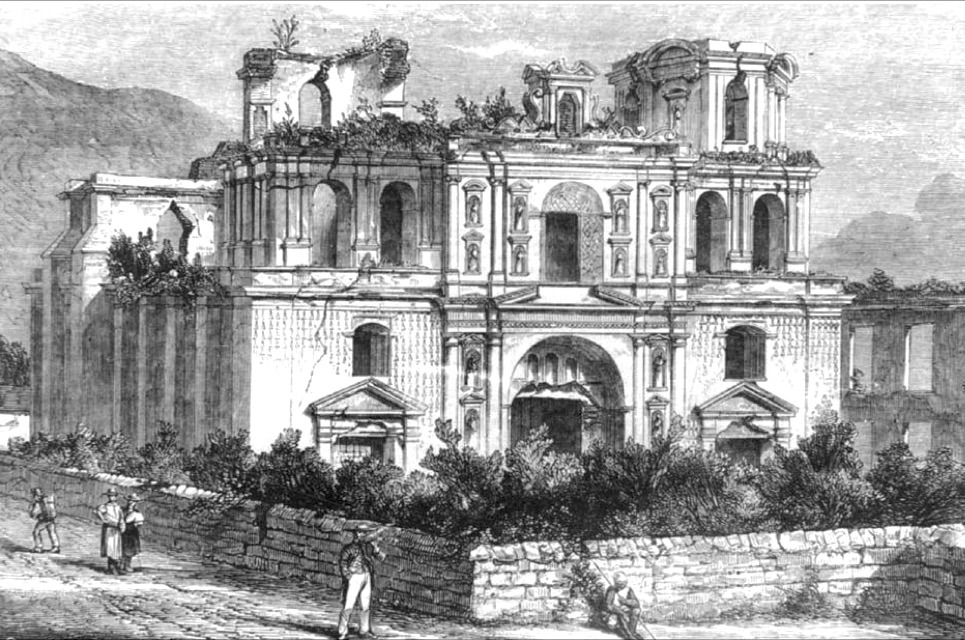
Society of Jesus church ruins in 1896.

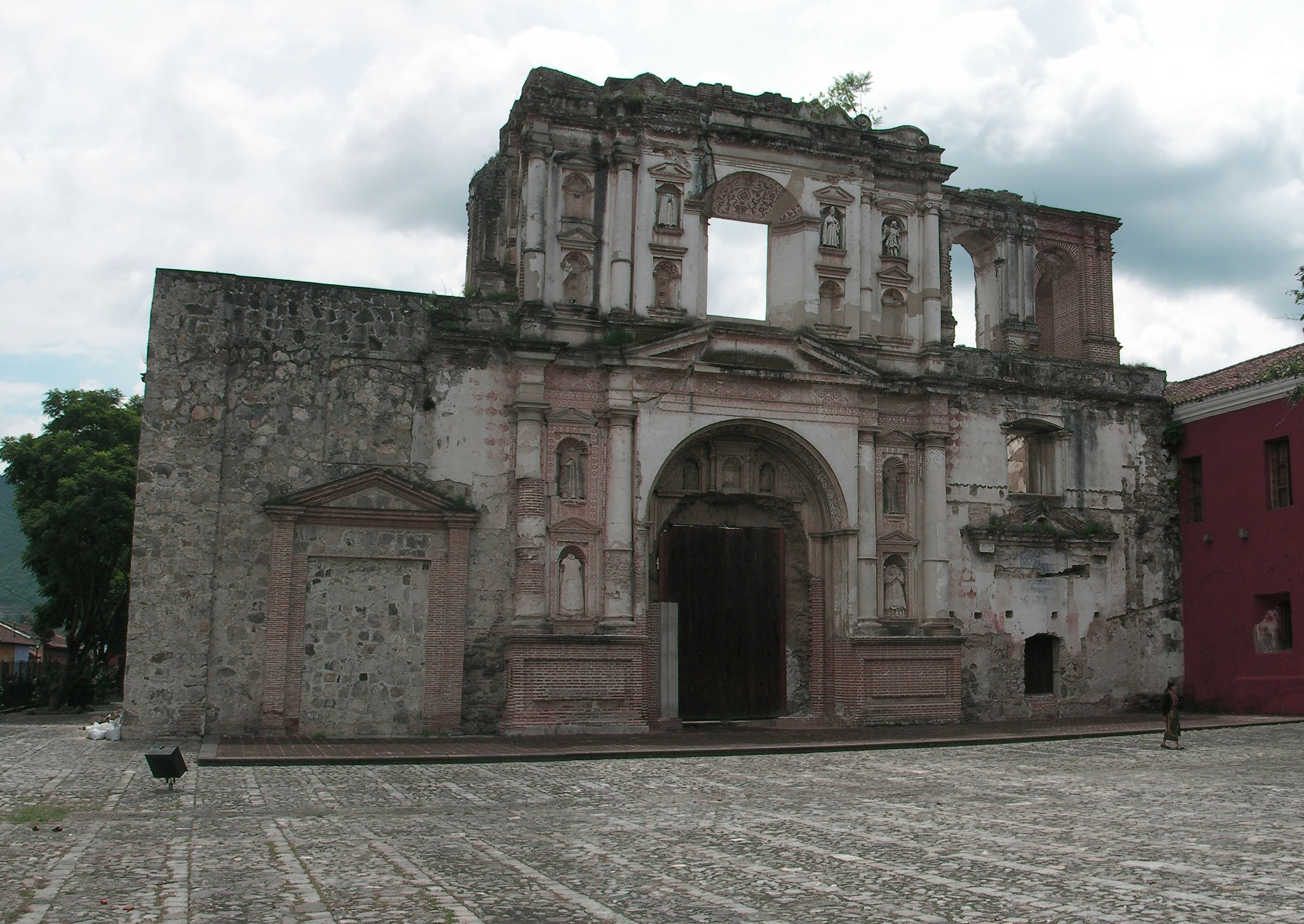
Jesuit church façade, stabilized in the 21st century. Note the damage to the structure after the 1976 earthquake.

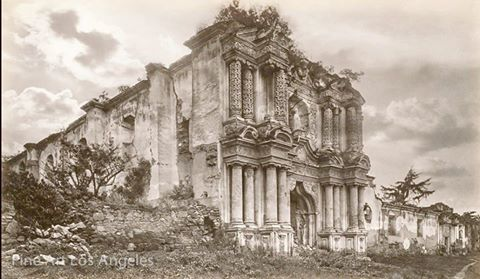
"Nuestra Señora del Carmen" Church in 1896.

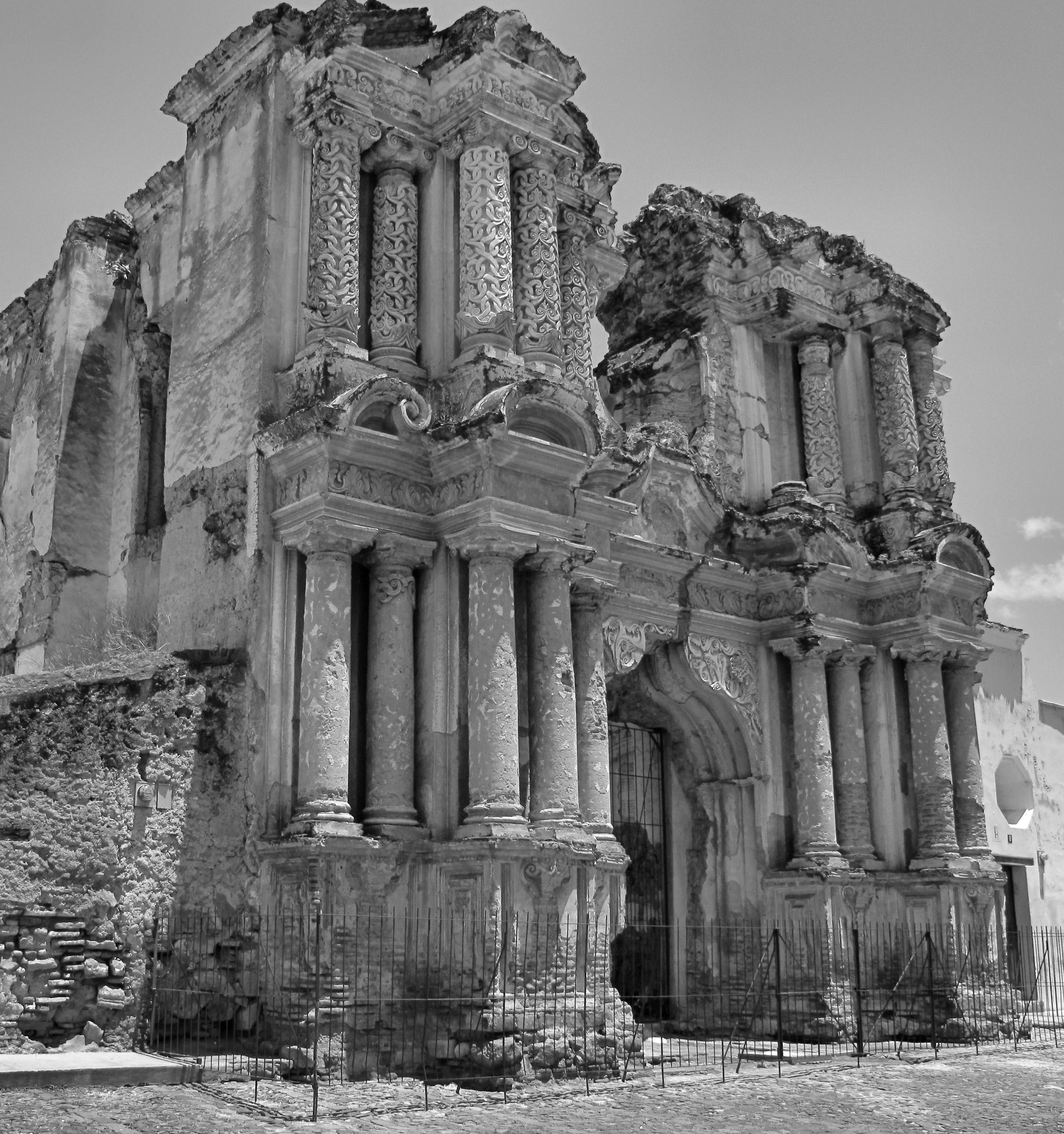
Same church in 2010, after the 1976 earthquake.

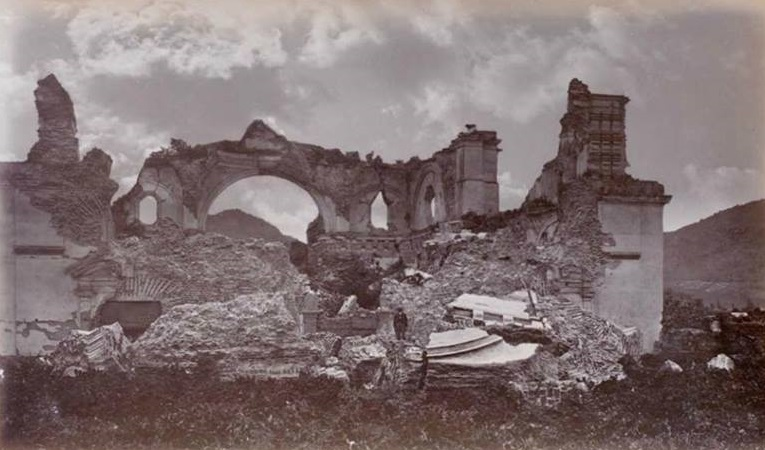
Iglesia de La Recolección in 1875. The only surviving arch was a symbol of Antigua Guatemala ruins for many years.

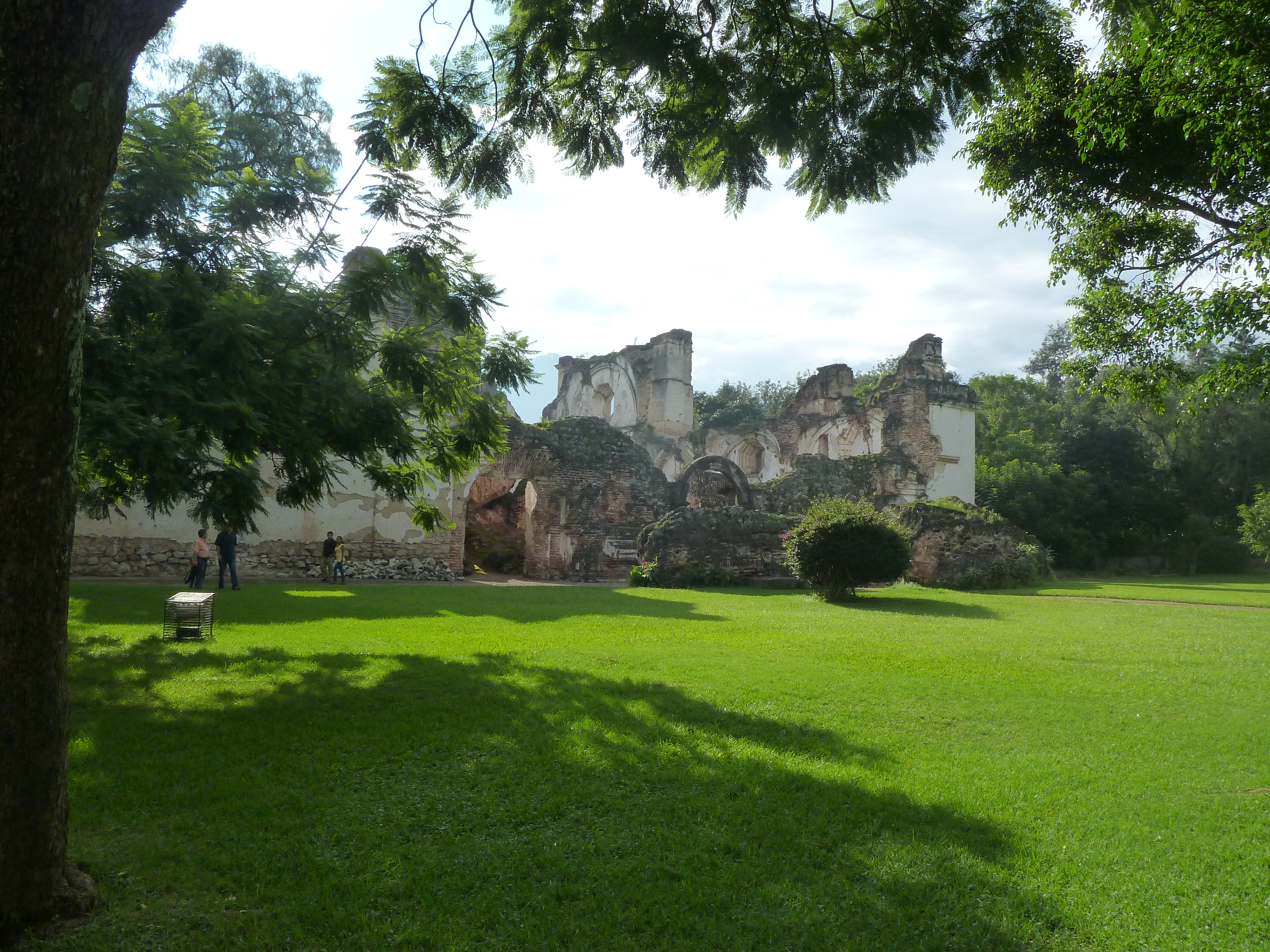
La Recolección in 2005. The 1917 and 1976 earthquakes destroyed what was left of the iconic arch.
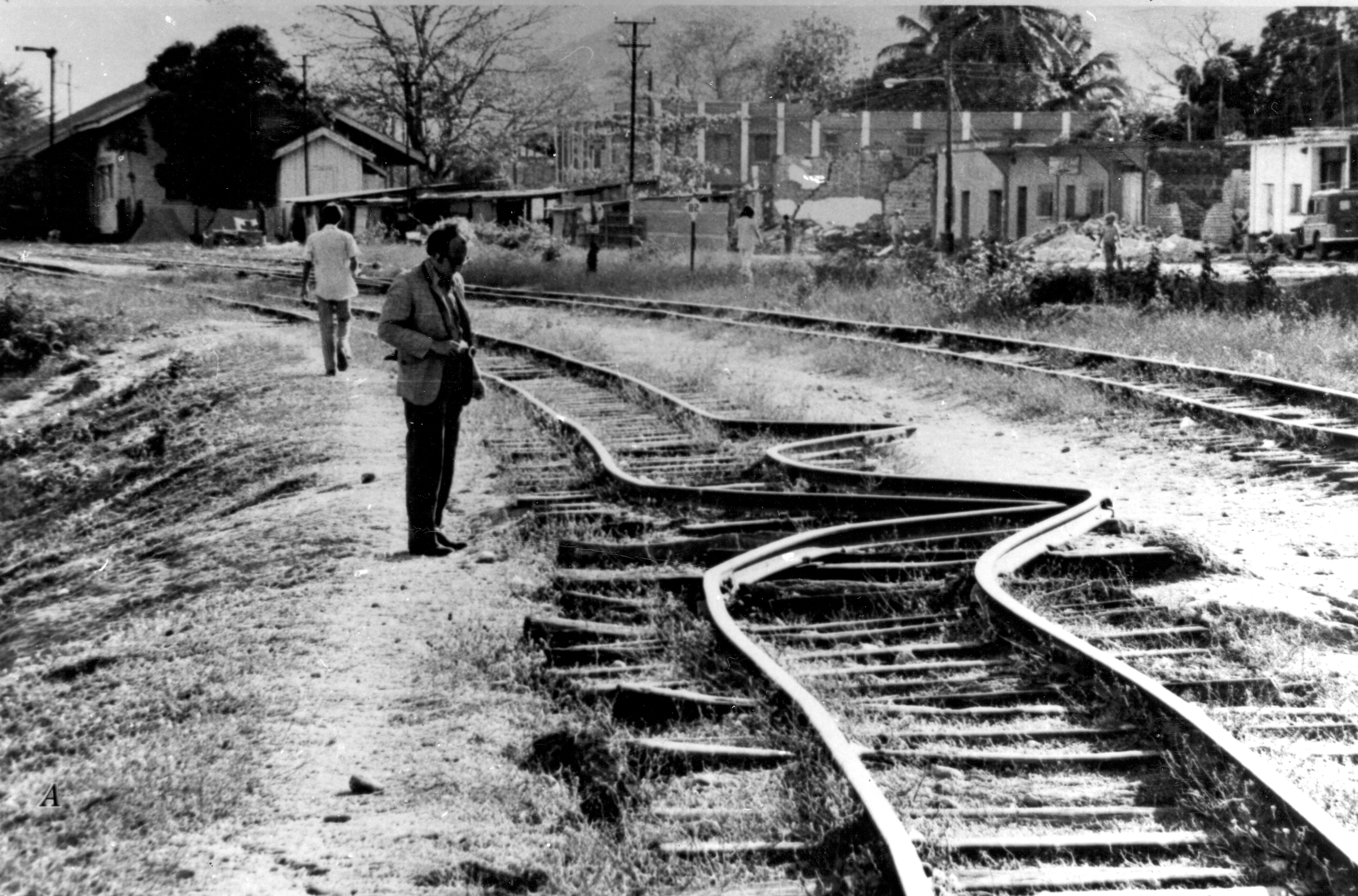
Bent rails in Gualán

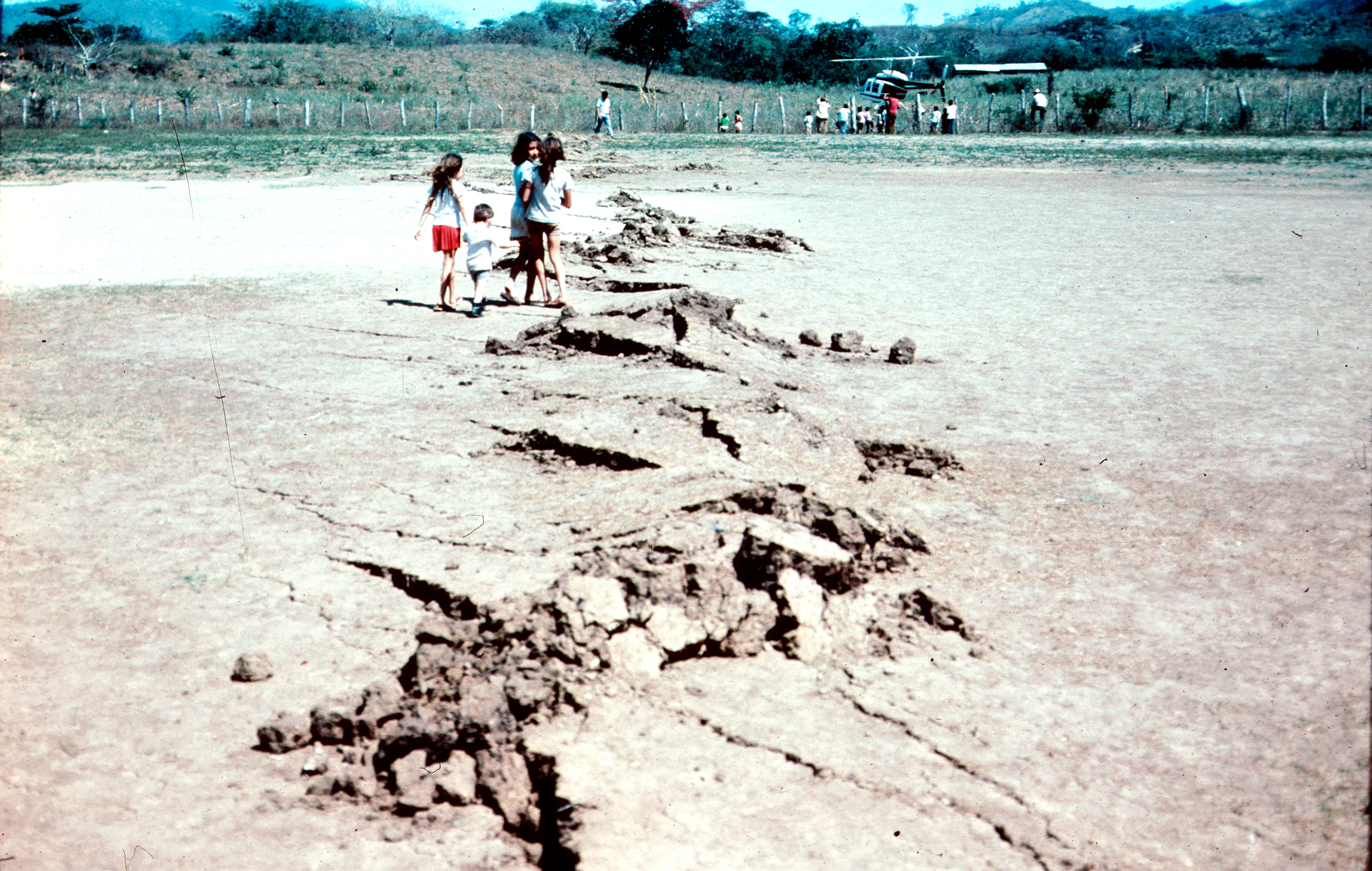
Motagua Fault in Gualán

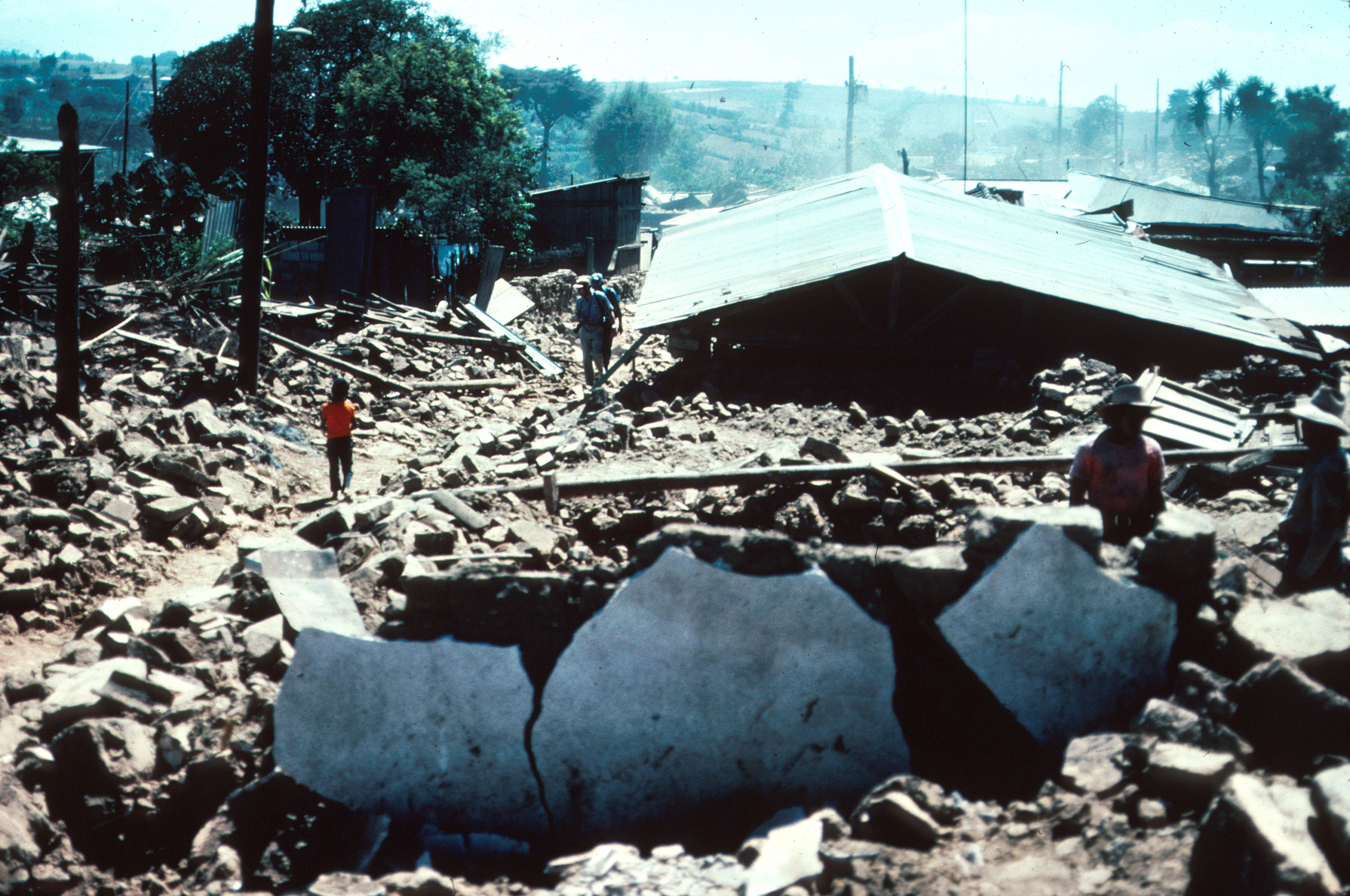
Patzicía destroyed

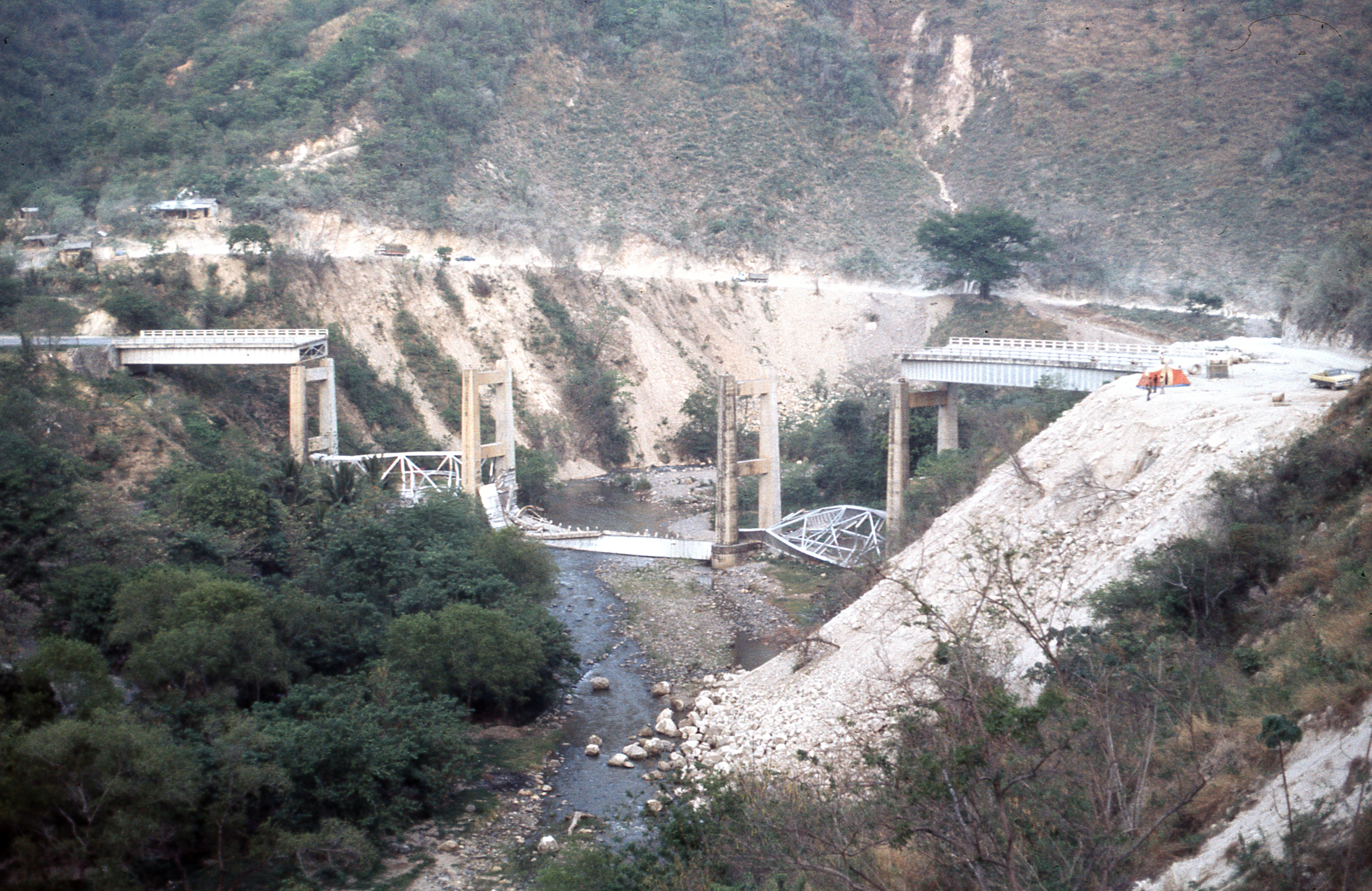
Puente de Agua Caliente, on the road to Cobán

== See also ==
- List of earthquakes in 1976
- List of earthquakes in Guatemala
