= Andrée Bordeaux-Le Pecq =

French illustrator

Andrée Bordeaux-Le Pecq (1910–1973) was a French visual artist.
