= Borderline (novel) =

2016 urban fantasy novel by Mishell Baker

- Author: Mishell Baker
- Audio read by: Arden Hammersmith
- Series: The Arcadia Project #1
- Genre: Urban Fantasy
- Set in: Hollywood, Fey realm
- Publisher: Saga Press
- Publication date: March 1, 2016
- Publication place: United States
- ISBN: 9781481429788
- Followed by: Phantom Pains

Borderline is a 2016 fantasy novel by American author Mishell Baker. It's the first book in the Arcadia Project trilogy, and was nominated for the Nebula Award and the World Fantasy Award.

== Background ==
Borderline is set in modern-day version of Los Angeles, in a world where gateways to the Fey realm exist. The main character, Millie, becomes involved with a secret organization called the Arcadia Project, which manages the Fey presence in our world, which remains unknown to the general population. Millie is a survivor of a suicide attempt, and is a double amputee as a result of her injuries. She's also diagnosed with borderline personality disorder (BPD). Baker has stated that she was motivated by the adage "write what you know", and so, as someone diagnosed with BPD herself, chose to make this condition a central theme of her novel. She set it in her home city and within the entertainment industry with which she's deeply familiar. Consequently, the novel uses a great deal of cinematic language and filmmaking settings.

Baker not only wanted to represent BPD – a diagnosis often misunderstood – in her writing, but she has also found that her own BPD was an advantage in writing a complex main character with multiple issues. Millie's story arc presents and explains various tendencies of people with BPD, including inducing antipathetic responses from others upon first meeting, overly questioning things, sorting ideas and people into "black and white" extremes, and intense displays of emotion.

In addition, Baker has said that she brought a gaming perspective to the novel, especially the focus on gamer's choice. She says, "I'm constantly thinking of the reader as a person who wants to take the wheel. I can't give readers actual choices in such a linear form, but I can try to imagine what they'd choose, and I can decide at a given point in the story whether it's best to gratify their desires or frustrate them. I always think of my stories as 'interactive' even when they aren't, in the strictest sense."

== Plot summary ==
Millie Roper is in a residential psychiatric treatment center following a suicide attempt that resulted in the amputation of both her legs. Previously, she was a promising film student, but now she's grappling with severe mental and physical health issues and running out of money. When a mysterious woman named Caryl Vallo offers her a job, Millie can't resist the promise that, after a year working for the Arcadia Project, she'll be offered a job in the film industry. She joins a household with other Arcadia team members.

Millie discovers that the Arcadia Project is a secret multinational organization responsible for relations with fairyland. Her first assignment is to find Rivenholt, a missing noble from the Seelie court. During her search, she uncovers shocking truths about Hollywood, such as the fact that almost every famous actor and filmmaker in history is connected to their Fey "echo", a sort of "soulmate" through which a person's talents can reach their full potential. Rivenholt's echo is David Berenbaum, a famous director who seems unable to help locate him.

Fey who spend too long in the human world begin to fade, as do the talent, beauty, and longevity of their echoes. The fear is that Rivenholt has been abducted or harmed, as he isn't likely to voluntarily stay away from the Seelie court. There is also concern that harm to a noble Fey could result in severe consequences from the Seelie court. Millie applies all her skills gained as an independent filmmaker, as well as the capabilities learned from managing her multiple disabilities in therapy, to move the investigation forward. She ultimately discovers that the stakes are higher than anyone imagined, for both worlds.

== Reception ==
In her NPR review of Borderline, Amal El-Mohtar calls the novel a "remarkably smooth and assured launch for her Arcadia Project series — a fast-paced story of high costs laced with humor that goes from light-hearted to scathing with the flip of a coin". She notes how much she appreciates that the character of bisexual, 20-something Millie is actually a filmmaker "who examines, curates and constructs narratives", and expresses her adoration of Millie, whom she describes as "brash, angry, incisively self-aware" and who is "the kind of furiously intelligent protagonist I love to read. Her first-person narration walks an amazing line between conveying her personality and explaining the way BPD interacts with it, while never actually making it or her disability the focus of the plot or giving the book an After-School Special feel".

In a starred review, Publishers Weekly commends how Borderline's "fully articulated, flawed, and fascinating characters combine with masterly urban fantasy storytelling", and concludes that the "richly nuanced presentation of Millie’s multiple diagnoses allows for a deeper knowledge of the character, which, in turn, serves to enhance an already beautifully written story that is one part mystery, one part fantasy, and wholly engrossing". In another starred review, Library Journal's verdict is that "Baker’s debut takes gritty urban fantasy in a new direction with flawed characters, painful life lessons, and not a small amount of humor. Millie’s inner battles serve as a unique foil of realism against the otherwordly action."

The Kirkus review of Borderline calls it a promising beginning to an "engaging urban fantasy series", in which Baker introduces a "hard-edged but appealing heroine". The review calls the pace "pleasant" and the settings glamorous, gritty, and lavish. The review does note, though, that the story "layers so many unlikely incidents that it strains credibility even in a world stuffed with the fantastical", and that Millie, "brash and volatile, crashes through and pulls everything along in her wake". However, the review adds that Millie's "stubborn insistence on survival and frequent matter-of-fact dissections of her problems manage to provoke fondness instead of pity", and that the "verve, sarcasm, and decency" with which she faces her catastrophic challenges "bode well for a developing series". It concludes that the book is enjoyable, tackling tough issues like "physical disability and mental illness without sacrificing diverting, fast-paced storytelling".

== Characters ==
- Millie Roper: Having survived a suicide attempt by jumping from a 7th story building, former indie filmmaker Millie is now a double amputee diagnosed with borderline personality disorder. She joins the Arcadia Project under the impression that it's a non-profit that assists people with mental disorders integrate in the film industry, only to discover that it actually manages the passageways between our world and that of the Fey.
- Caryl Vallo: A mysterious, eccentric woman who recruits Millie to join the Arcadia Project.
- Teo Salazar: Described as a heartthrob, Teo is a talented chef who has bipolar disorder. He's a housemate in Arcadia Residence four, and Millie's partner on her first assignment. The two get off to a rocky start.
- Gloria: A southern blonde, Gloria is a little person with a narcissism problem and a bad attitude, particularly towards Millie.
- Tjuan: Gloria's partner. Strong and silent, he's a disgraced screenwriter who exhibits symptoms of paranoia.
- Song: The gentle and compassionate manager of Arcadia's Residence Four. A single mother.
- Johnny Riven/Viscount Rivenholt: A missing movie star who is really a noble of the Seelie court.
- David Berenbaum: A famous film director, still active at the age of 70, thanks to his muse, Viscount Rivenholt.
- Vivian: A sadistic blood-sucking Hollywood talent agent.
- Inaya: An attractive A-list star whose involvement with Johnny raises questions in the investigation.
- Clay: A police detective who crosses swords with Millie as they both search for Rivenholt.
- Foxfeather: A Seelie baroness who likes oranges and dislikes clothing.

== Awards ==
Year	Award	Category	Result	Ref.
2016	James Tiptree Jr. Award	—	Shortlisted	
2016	Nebula Award	Novel	Shortlisted	
2017	RUSA CODES Reading List	Fantasy	Shortlisted	
2017	World Fantasy Award	Novel	Shortlisted	
2019	Mythopoeic Awards	Adult Literature^{A}	Shortlisted	

=== Notes ===
^{A} nomination is for the entire Arcadia Project series

== External ==
- Borderline at the Library of Congress
- Borderline (novel) at LibraryThing
- Borderline at Goodreads
- Borderline title listing at the Internet Speculative Fiction Database
