= The Border (1982 film) =

1982 film by Tony Richardson

- Theatrical release poster
- Directed by: Tony Richardson
- Written by: Deric Washburn; Walon Green; David Freeman
- Produced by: Edgar Bronfman Jr.
- Starring: Jack Nicholson; Harvey Keitel; Valerie Perrine; Warren Oates; Elpidia Carrillo; Dirk Blocker
- Cinematography: Ric Waite
- Edited by: Robert K. Lambert
- Music by: Ry Cooder
- Production companies: Efer Productions; RKO Pictures
- Distributed by: Universal Pictures
- Release date: February 12, 1982
- Running time: 108 minutes
- Country: United States
- Language: English
- Budget: $22 million
- Box office: $6,118,683 (US)

The Border is a 1982 American neo-noir dramatic crime thriller film directed by Tony Richardson and starring Jack Nicholson alongside Harvey Keitel, Valerie Perrine, Elpidia Carrillo and Warren Oates.

== Plot ==
Immigration enforcement agent Charlie Smith lives in California with his wife, Marcy, in a trailer. She persuades him to move to a duplex in El Paso, Texas, shared by her friend and border agent Cat. Marcy longs for a life of luxury and sees a chance to do so with this move. She opens a charge account and starts to purchase expensive items (like a water bed) as she tries to build a dream home.

Cat gradually introduces Charlie to the human smuggling operation he runs with their supervisor Red. Though Charlie initially declines to participate, his wife's free-spending ways make him finally take part in the operation. Meanwhile, a young Mexican mother, Maria, that he has observed is detained, and while she is in their custody, one of Cat's drivers abducts her baby for an illegal adoption. Cat warns the driver not to do anything but transport people in trucks, and that if he runs drugs or babies, Cat will hurt him.

Charlie finally realizes that Cat and Red are killing drivers who make money off side ventures or anyone who gets in their way. Charlie makes it clear to Cat that he will not be a party to murder. In the film's climax, he is forced to kill Cat. He tracks down the kidnapped infant and returns it to Maria.

== Cast ==
- Jack Nicholson as Charlie Smith
- Harvey Keitel as Cat
- Valerie Perrine as Marcy
- Warren Oates as Red
- Elpidia Carrillo as Maria
- Shannon Wilcox as Savannah
- Manuel Viescas as Juan
- Jeff Morris as J.J.
- Dirk Blocker as Beef
- Mike Gomez as Manuel
- Lonny Chapman as Andy

== Production notes ==
Nicholson joined the project after Robert Blake, who had originally been cast in the lead role, dropped out. As soon as Nicholson became involved, the film's budget increased from $4.5 million to $14.5 million, and continued to rise. Nicholson and director Tony Richardson had known each other since the 1966 Cannes Film Festival, in which Richardson's film Mademoiselle was in competition. Nicholson declined a role in Miloš Forman's Ragtime in order to portray the character of Charlie Smith.

Two weeks after production began in El Paso, the 1980 actors strike forced a shutdown that lasted 11 weeks. As a result, the original cinematographer, Vilmos Zsigmond, was unable to return to the project and was replaced by Ric Waite.

In his memoir The Long-Distance Runner, Richardson described Nicholson as someone who "liked to be told where to be and what to do, and who could instantly deliver the goods required. In terms of stating or playing a scene, Jack didn't want to experiment or to try different ideas, but whatever I asked he would do—and with great authority."

The film's original ending, in which Nicholson's character bombed the Border Patrol headquarters and was subsequently imprisoned, was deemed too negative by preview audiences. A new ending was filmed one year after principal photography, with Zsigmond returning as cinematographer, at an estimated additional cost of $1.5 million.

The opening earthquake scenes were filmed in Antigua, specifically in La Recoleccion ruins, and Guatemala City.

The soundtrack contains the Jim Dickinson, John Hiatt, and Ry Cooder song "Across the Borderline" performed by Freddy Fender.

== Reception ==
Vincent Canby of The New York Times said the movie "has the sort of predictable outrage and shape of a made-for-television movie. It has suspense but little excitement. Once the people and the situation have been introduced, there's not a single surprise in the film, nothing of the uncharacteristic sort that differentiates the adequate melodrama from one that is special and memorable. Like so many films prompted by real-life social problems, The Border is a movie in which the characters appear to have been created to fit the events. Missing is any sense of particularity, as well as the excitement that comes when the members of the audience are allowed to discover some sort of truth for themselves."

Gene Siskel, in his review for the Chicago Tribune, praised the way Nicholson served the film but criticized the ending.

On Rotten Tomatoes, the film holds a rating of 65% from 26 reviews. The site's consensus states: "It makes frustratingly facile work of its thorny premise, but Jack Nicholson's gritty lead performance keeps The Border worth watching." Audiences polled by CinemaScore gave the film an average grade of "C+" on an A+ to F scale.
