= Borderline (band) =

American country music band

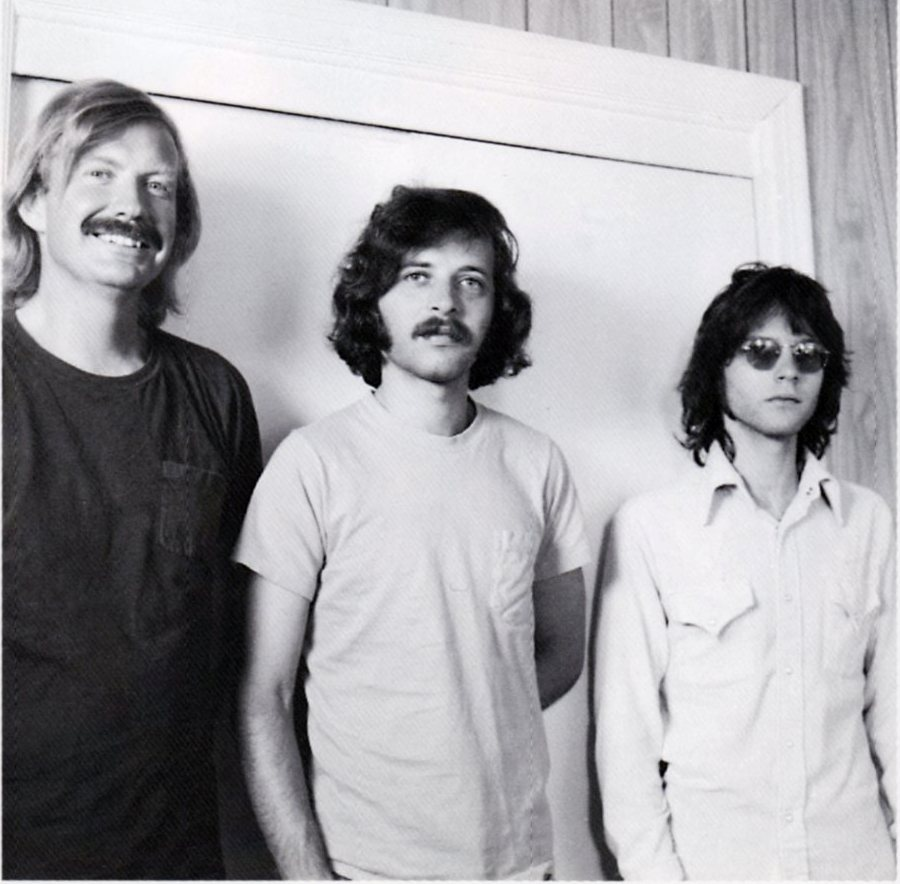
- Borderline in 1973. L to R: Jim Rooney, David Gershen, Jon Gershen

Background information
- Origin: Woodstock, New York, United States
- Genres: Country rock, Americana, Roots rock
- Years active: 1972–1974
- Labels: Avalanche/United Artists, EMI/Japan, Real Gone Music
- Past members: Jon Gershen, David Gershen, Jim Rooney

Borderline was an early-1970s band from Woodstock, New York, that fused elements of folk, rock, country and jazz. Consisting of brothers David Gershen (born 1947) and Jon Gershen (born 1950) as well as Jim Rooney (b. 1938), the trio recorded two albums, the second of which was not officially released until 2001, and then only in Japan, due to record company problems. Though the group did not enjoy a great deal of commercial success, it was part of the "Woodstock scene" of the early 1970s that included Van Morrison and the Band. Borderline was a forerunner of musical artists who would eventually be grouped under the "Americana" genre. Also notable is that their two albums featured some well-known backing musicians including members of the Band. After Borderline broke up in 1974, the Gershen brothers pursued various projects while Rooney became a successful producer in Nashville, working with artists including Iris DeMent, Nanci Griffith and John Prine.

== Origins ==
In 1968, the Gershen brothers, who were raised in New Jersey, formed a rock band in New York City called the Montgomeries. Another founding member of this band was Tony Brown who would later appear on Bob Dylan's album "Blood on the Tracks." In 1969, the Montgomeries relocated to Woodstock, where they crossed paths with other recently transplanted musicians including Van Morrison, who often played gigs with them. Morrison, in fact, became a good friend of the Montgomeries and the band that would become Borderline during the early days in Woodstock. After the Montgomeries broke up, Jon Gershen met Rooney, a veteran of the Boston folk music scene who had moved to Woodstock in 1971. Rooney was at the time working as business manager at Bearsville Studios, which was built by Albert Grossman, who managed Bob Dylan, Janis Joplin and the Band. Guitarists Rooney and Gershen got together for some informal music-making sessions and discovered they had a unique sound that should be pursued further. Soon after, they invited David Gershen – who specialized in folk and country music – to join in. The trio, still unnamed, began seriously working together in the fall of 1971. They landed a record contract with United Artists Records, which had once expressed interest in the Montgomeries. They eventually chose the name Borderline to reflect the way their different styles existed in close proximity to each other.

== First album ==
Borderline began recording its first album in April 1972, helped by a stellar cast of musicians that lived in and around Woodstock. Richard Manuel and Garth Hudson, keyboardists in the Band, dropped in for a few tunes (they were later credited under pseudonyms, following Grossman's wishes). Other musicians included former Mothers Of Invention drummer Billy Mundi, fiddle player Vassar Clements, saxophonist David Sanborn, bassist Jim Colegrove and longtime Neil Young sideman Ben Keith on pedal steel guitar and dobro. John Simon, who produced the band's first two albums, played piano on several tracks. The resulting album, "Sweet Dreams and Quiet Desires," was released on UA's Avalanche label in April 1973. In addition to the U.S. pressing, editions of the record were manufactured and sold in the UK, Germany, France, Italy, Japan, and Australia. The press materials promoting the album featured a blurb of approval by Van Morrison. The album was well-received critically but did not sell in great numbers. The 11 tracks included traditional bluegrass songs like "Handsome Molly" and "Clinch Mountain," plus originals including Jon Gershen's jazzy "Dragonfly" and David Gershen's country/rock tune "The Distance." Lead vocals were distributed more or less evenly by all three members. Avalanche/UA also issued a single from "Sweet Dreams" in the United States and the UK featuring two songs by David Gershen. The "A" side of the 45 was "Don't Know Where I'm Going," and the "B" side was "Marble Eyes."

== Second album ==
The group began working on its ill-fated second album in August 1973. This time around, they chose to record at CRS Studios in Bridgeport, Connecticut, owned by award-winning producer Paul Leka. Once again, they were backed by a well-known assemblage of musicians, including guitarist Amos Garrett, bassist Will Lee, Ben Keith, David Sanborn and drummer Chris Parker. Jon Gershen, who produced, even brought in a New York City horn section of Michael Brecker, Randy Brecker and Barry Rogers. The album, originally titled simply "Borderline" but later changed to "The Second Album," was scheduled for release in January 1974. One of the album's more notable tracks was the energetic opener, Dave Gershen's "Sonny Boy," a catchy horn-driven tune which had tentatively been chosen as the single. As with the first album, all three band members contributed original songs and shared lead vocals. Unfortunately for the band, a personnel change within UA Records around this time ended up scuttling the planned release of "The Second Album." As Jon Gershen has explained, the executive who signed Borderline to UA, who was also the band's greatest proponent at the label, unexpectedly left the company. His replacement ended up putting a hold on all the projects that were not yet released. The result was that "The Second Album" was shelved. It would not become available until long after the band had broken up. Shortly after UA pulled the plug, Borderline decided to call it quits. The story of the never-released second album had a happy ending of sorts when EMI Japan released it on CD in 2001 (in the mid-1980s, EMI acquired the entire UA Records catalog). The original master tapes were thought to be lost, and so the CD was sourced from an old acetate. This release occurred one year after EMI Japan issued Borderline's first album on CD. The 2000 release of "Sweet Dreams and Quiet Desires" in Japan marked the first time Borderline's music had been made available on CD. The packaging featured extensive liner notes by critic Kenta Hagiwara. The Japanese releases, though somewhat hard to find, suggested that Borderline was finally gaining some recognition as a historically important part of the "Woodstock music scene" of the early 1970s.

== U.S. releases of CDs ==
In January 2013, Real Gone Music (distributed by Sony Music Entertainment) released the group's two albums (on one disc), representing the first time the trio's music had been released on CD in the United States. The sound quality was a step up from the Japanese reissues, with Real Gone using the original two-track master tapes for both albums finally located by EMI after a recent reorganization of its archives. The packaging included new liner notes by Richie Unterberger and rare photos supplied by Jon Gershen.

== Rooney, the Gershen brothers after Borderline ==
After Borderline broke up, Rooney turned his attention to recording a solo album and participating in releases by the Woodstock Mountains Revue. He then moved to Nashville where he worked with legendary producer and songwriter "Cowboy" Jack Clement for many years at his studio Jack's Tracks. Rooney went on to make a name for himself as a successful producer in his own right, winning a Grammy Award in 1993 for Nanci Griffith's album Other Voices, Other Rooms. Dave Gershen moved to Colorado and pursued a solo career, occasionally performing and recording. Jon Gershen moved to Western Massachusetts and established a music publishing company while continuing to write and record. The Gershen brothers reunited in 2003 for the album "Faded Glory," released on Boardinghouse Records under the name of "Dave Gershen & Jon Gershen." Some work has been done on a follow-up to "Faded Glory," but the project remains unfinished. In addition to working with his brother, Jon Gershen has produced a number of albums for other recording artists.
