= Bordeaux (St. Thomas, U.S. Virgin Islands) =

- U.S. National Register of Historic Places
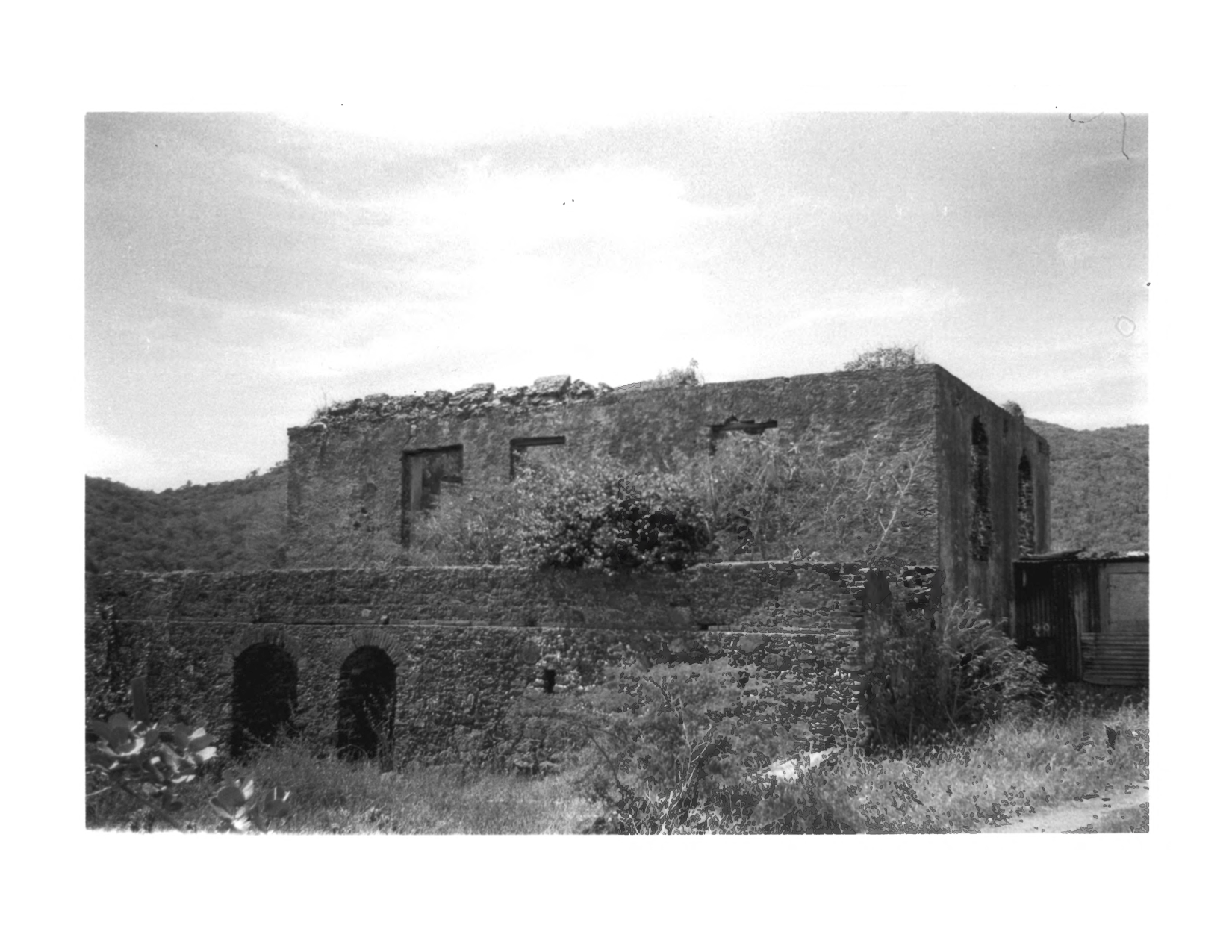
- Estate Bordeaux Great House

- Location within the U.S. Virgin Islands
- Location: West End, west of Charlotte Amalie, St. Thomas, Virgin Islands
- Coordinates: 18.363056°N 65.016389°W
- Area: 14.6 acres (5.9 ha)
- Built: 1730
- NRHP reference No.: 78002726
- Added to NRHP: November 15, 1978

Bordeaux, also known as Estate Bordeaux, is a historic former sugar plantation located on the West End of Saint Thomas, U.S. Virgin Islands. It was listed on the U.S. National Register of Historic Places in 1978. The listing included three contributing buildings and a contributing structure.

King Christian V gave the estate to the Brandenburg Company in 1695. The estate was owned by several owners between 1739 and 1854, when it was sold to Rasmus Wilhelm Rasmussen, whose family then sold the estate (though not the Great House) to the V.I. Government in 1955.

It is located on a bluff 680 feet (210 m) above Bordeaux Bay. In 1978 the buildings were in ruins. The former Great House of the plantation, in the West End Quarter, is a two-room building with plastered rubble walls, with a basement and with a porch along its south facade. It originally had a hipped roof which is gone. It has a one-story 20 by 31 feet (6.1 m × 9.4 m) addition on the west side, with a corrugated tin roof. Ruins of cisterns and outbuildings are nearby. A former mill building and factory are located some distance away from the great house. By the water is a one-room building 44 by 30 feet (13.4 m × 9.1 m) in plan, probably a sugar warehouse, with 22 inches (0.56 m) rubble and coral block walls.
