= Scapular of Our Lady of Ransom =

Catholic devotional garment

The Scapular of Our Lady of Mercy is a Catholic devotional scapular that traces its roots to the Order of the Blessed Virgin Mary of Mercy also known as Our Lady of Ransom (Latin: Ordo Beatae Mariae de Mercede redemptionis captivorum) which was founded by St. Peter Nolasco in the city of Barcelona, at that time in the Kingdom of Aragon, for the redemption of Christian captives.

== Description ==
The scapular is white and the front has a picture of Our Lady of Mercy. The back has a symbol representing the Blessed Virgin Mary.

The indulgences for the confraternity was approved by the Congregation for Indulgences in 1868. After the reforms of the Second Vatican Council the indulgences attached to the scapular were renewed by the Apostolic Penitentiary in 1967 and include a plenary indulgence under the usual conditions (i.e. the person must exclude all attachment to sin of any kind, even venial sin, must perform the work or say the prayer for which the indulgence is granted, and must also fulfill the three conditions of sacramental confession, Eucharistic communion and praying for the intentions of the Pope.) on:

1. The day of enrollment
2. The day of the following Mercedarian feasts: St. Peter Armengol (April 27), St. Peter Nolasco (May 6), St. Raymond Nonnatus (August 31), St. Mary de Cervellione (September 19), Our Lady of Mercy (September 24), St. Serapion (November 14), and St. Peter Pascual (December 6)

== See also ==
- Scapular
