= Our Lady of Ransom =

Our Lady of Ransom may refer to:

- Feast of Our Lady of Ransom, former Mercedarian devotion
  - Order of the Blessed Virgin Mary of Mercy or Mercedarians, in full the Royal, Celestial and Military Order of Our Lady of Mercy and the Redemption of the Captives
  - Our Lady of Mercy, replacement devotion for the Feast of Our Lady of Ransom
- Our Lady of Los Remedios, Trinitarian devotion of which Remedios has been variously translated "Remedies", "Help", or "Ransom".
