= The Vision of Saint Peter Nolasco =

Painting by Francisco de Zurbarán

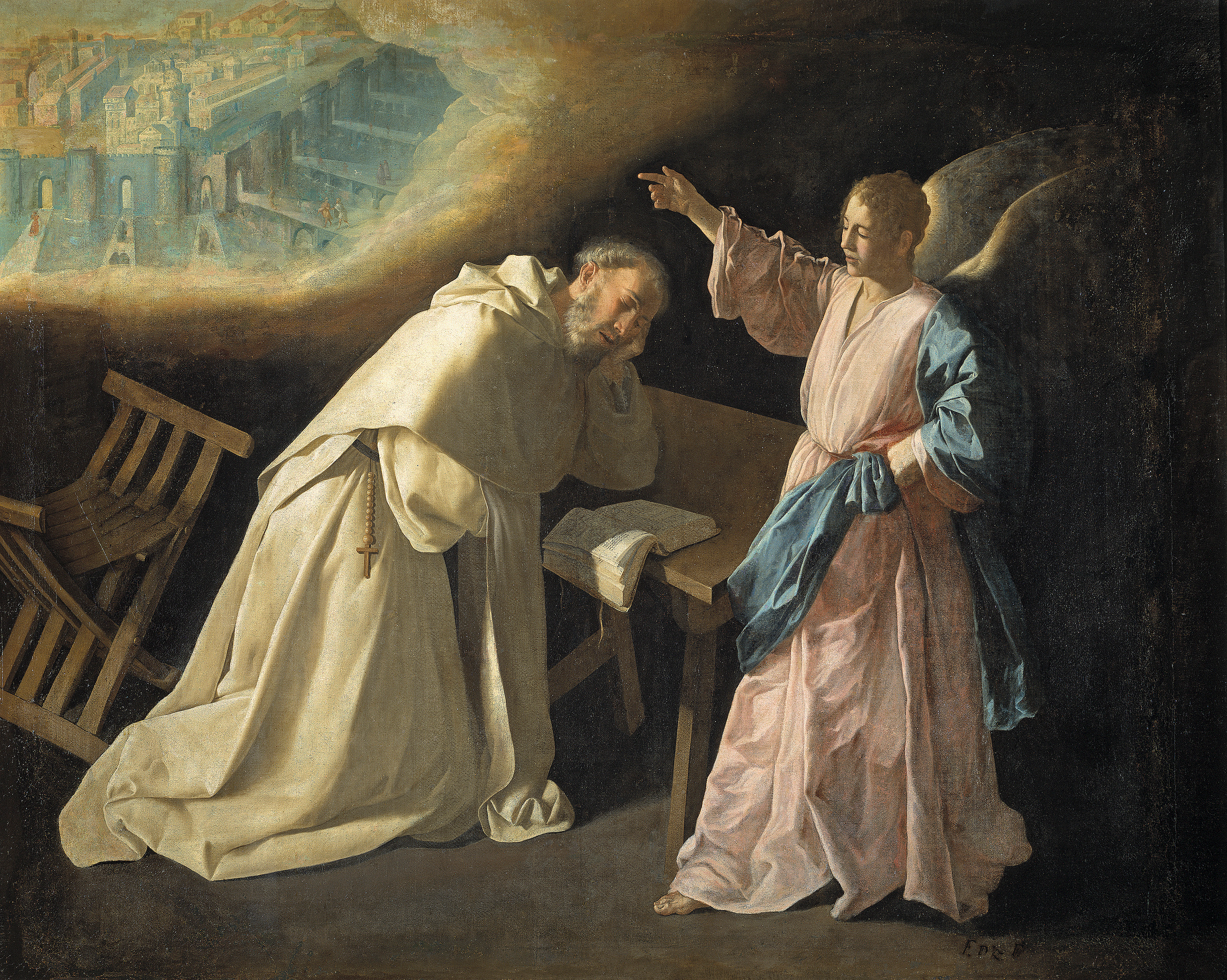
- Artist: Francisco de Zurbarán
- Year: 1629
- Medium: oil on canvas
- Location: Museo del Prado, Madrid

The Vision of Saint Peter Nolasco is a 1629 oil-on-canvas painting by the Spanish painter Francisco de Zurbarán, now in the Museo del Prado in Madrid. It and its pair Saint Peter Nolasco's Vision of Saint Peter the Apostle were both commissioned by the Mercedarians for the Merced Calzada Abbey the year after pope Urban VIII's canonisation of Peter Nolasco, who had founded both the Order and the Abbey. The Order also commissioned twenty other paintings for the occasion, though only Zurbarán's pair and nine others still survive.

Vision shows Nolasco dreaming of the Heavenly Jerusalem from the Book of Revelation, shown in the top left and pointed to by an angel to his right. In 1808 the canvas was bought by canon López Cepero who gave it and the rest of his collection to Ferdinand VII of Spain in 1821.
