= Saint Peter Nolasco's Vision of Saint Peter the Apostle =

1629 painting by Francisco de Zurbarán

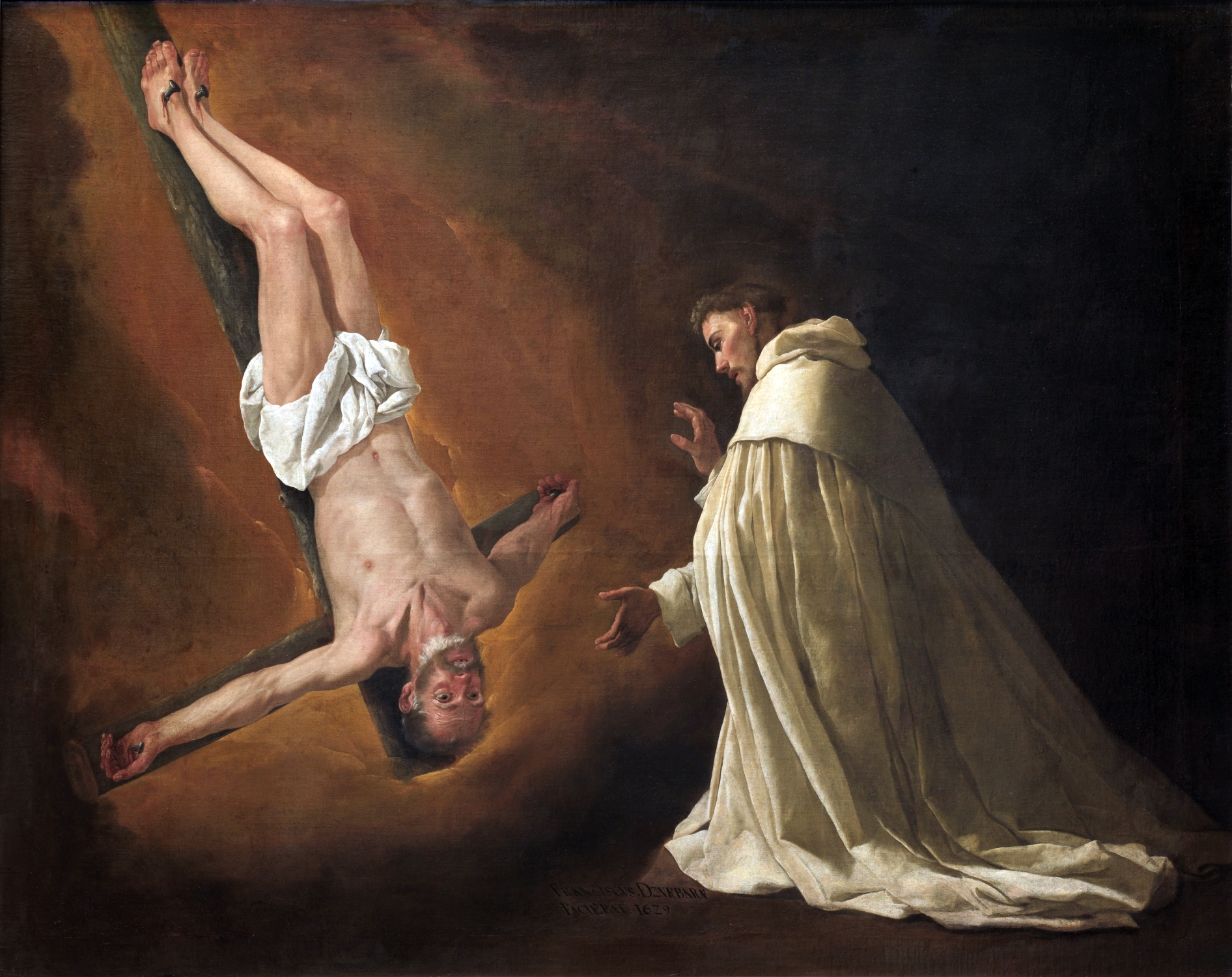
Saint Peter Nolasco's Vision of Saint Peter the Apostle (1629) by Francisco de Zurbarán

Saint Peter Nolasco's Vision of Saint Peter the Apostle is a 1629 oil painting on canvas by the Spanish painter Francisco de Zurbarán, now in the Prado Museum in Madrid. It is signed at the bottom FRANCISCUS Đ ZURBARAN/ FACIEBAT. 1629..

== History ==
Both works were produced the year after Nolasco's canonisation for the Convent of Mercy in Seville, which he had founded and which now houses the city's Museum of Fine Arts. The two works formed part of a group of 22 paintings commissioned by the monastery from various artists to mark the canonisation - only eleven now survive. In 1808 the work was bought by Manuel López Cepero, dean of Seville Cathedral, who thirteen years later gave it to Ferdinand VII of Spain.

== Description ==
It shows Peter the Apostle crucified upside-down appearing to Peter Nolasco, founder of the Order of the Blessed Virgin Mary of Mercy, which redeemed Christian slaves from Muslim owners during the Reconquista period in Spanish history. When he was prevented from making a hoped-for trip to Rome to visit St Peter's tomb, he received a consolatory vision from St Peter instructing him to convert Spain. It forms a pair with the same artist's The Vision of Saint Peter Nolasco, in which the saint dreams of the Heavenly Jerusalem.
