= Feast of Our Lady of Ransom =

Roman Catholic liturgical feast

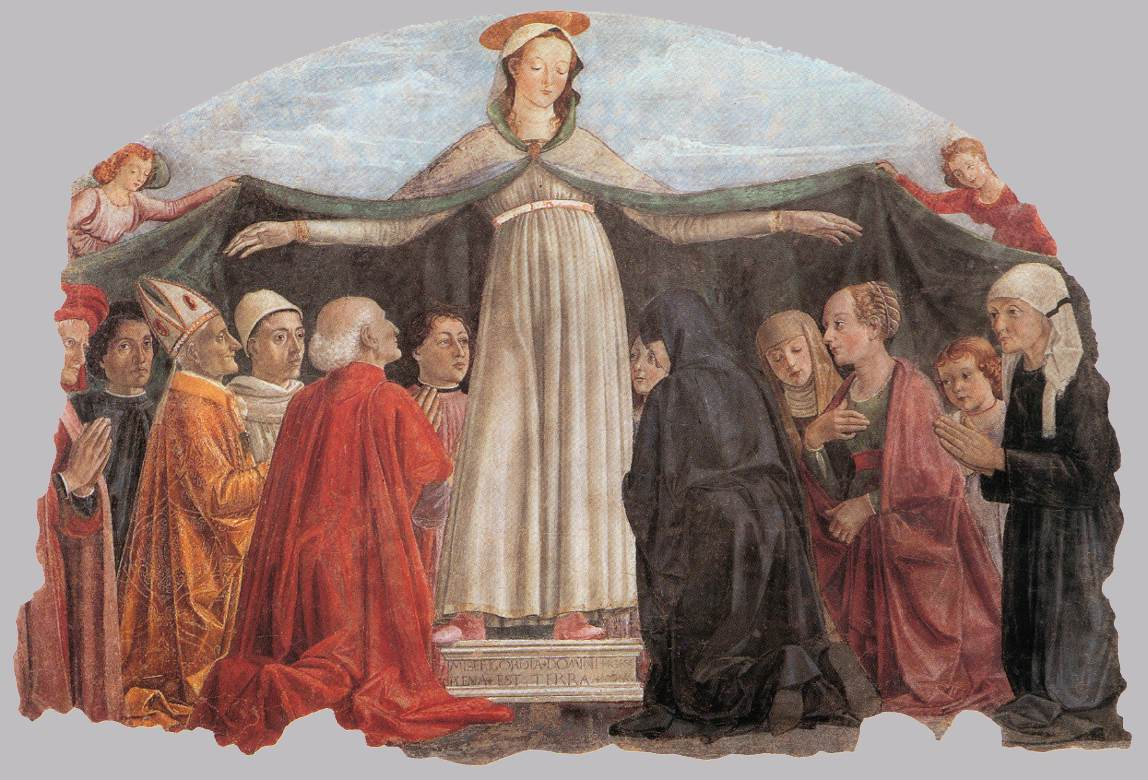
Maria de Mercede, fresco by Domenico Ghirlandaio (c. 1472)

The Feast of Our Lady of Ransom (Nuestra Señora de la Merced) is a Roman Catholic liturgical Marian feast. In the General Roman Calendar of 1960, it was celebrated on 24 September, commemorating the foundation of the Mercedarians. After Vatican II, the name for the Marian commemoration on that date was changed to "Our Lady of Mercy".

The Feast of Our Lady of Ransom is no longer included in the General Roman calendar, but continues to be greatly celebrated in certain places like Vallarpadam Church, in Barcelona and in the Order of the Mercedarians.

== Background ==
Between the 8th and the 15th centuries, medieval Europe was in a state of intermittent warfare between the Christian kingdoms of southern France, Sicily and portions of Spain and the Muslim states of North Africa. Raids by Islamic forces was an almost annual occurrence. Capture, whether by pirates or raiders, was a continuous threat to residents of coastal areas on both sides of the conflict.

In 1218, Peter Nolasco was inspired to establish a religious order for the redemption of captives seized by the Moors in Spain and on the seas. Its charism of the redemption of Christian captives was similar to that of the Order of the Most Holy Trinity established some twenty years earlier in France by saints John of Matha and Felix of Valois. Given that the Caliphate of Córdoba occupied a significant portion of the Iberian peninsula, the Mercedarians differed from the Trinitarians in that originally its membership held more knights than clerics. The former guarded the coasts, and undertook the dangerous task of ransoming Christian captives, while the clerics were charged with the celebration of the Divine Office in the commanderies.

On 10 August 1223, the Mercedarian Order was legally constituted at Barcelona by King James of Aragon and was approved by Pope Gregory IX on 17 January 1235.

== History ==
A feast day was instituted and observed on 24 September, first in the religious order, then in Spain and France. The calendar of the Spanish Mercedarians of 1644 has it on 1 August, as a double. Proper lessons were approved on 30 April 1616. The feast was granted to Spain (on the Sunday nearest to 1 August) on 15 February 1680, and to France, on 4 December 1690. On 22 February 1696, it was extended to the entire Latin Church, and the date changed to 24 September.

The Mercedarians keep this feast as a double of the first class, with a vigil, privileged octave, and proper Office under the title: "Solemnitas Descensionis B. Mariæ V. de Mercede".

In August 1805, Sicily, which had suffered so much from the Saracens, was given permission by the Congregation of Rites to observe the commemoration of the "Apparition of Our Lady to St. Peter Nolasco in the choir of Barcelona" on the old date of the feast (the Sunday nearest to 1 August). In England the devotion to Our Lady of Ransom was revived in modern times in recognition of its historic title as Our Lady's Dowry.

== Iconography ==
Sometimes Our Lady of Ransom is depicted holding the scapular of the order. As a mendicant order, the clerics sought donations to raise the funds to pay ransoms. When Christian rulers recovered more land on the Iberian peninsula, some of it was given to the Mercedarians. They divided their funds into thirds: to ransom captives, maintain the order, and assist the poor. The Virgin was often depicted holding two bags of coins, representing the ransoms raised. In other depictions, she holds the bag of coins in one hand and the scapular in the other.

As Our Lady of Ransom was also known as Nuestra Señora de la Merced (Our Lady of Mercy), later representations mirrored that motif, showing people sheltered for protection under her outspread cloak.

== Patronage ==
Our Lady of Ransom is the principal patron of Barcelona, Spain, and of Bahay Pare, Candaba, Mercedes, Catbalogan, and Novaliches in the Philippines. She is also the co-patroness of the Dominican Republic.

== Crown of Twelve Stars of Our Lady of Mercy ==
The "Crown of Twelve Stars of Our Lady of Mercy" is an ancient devotion of the Order of Our Lady of Mercy based on Revelation 12:1: "And a great sign appeared in heaven: a woman clothed with the sun, and the moon under her feet, and on her head a crown of twelve stars."

It is prayed on a chaplet. The chaplet consists of a medal, five Our Father beads, and three sets of four beads each where the Hail Mary is prayed in honor of Our Lady's Crown of Excellence. The chaplet ends with a Glory Be.
