= Pedro Armengol =

Spanish saint

Saint Pedro Armengol O. de M.
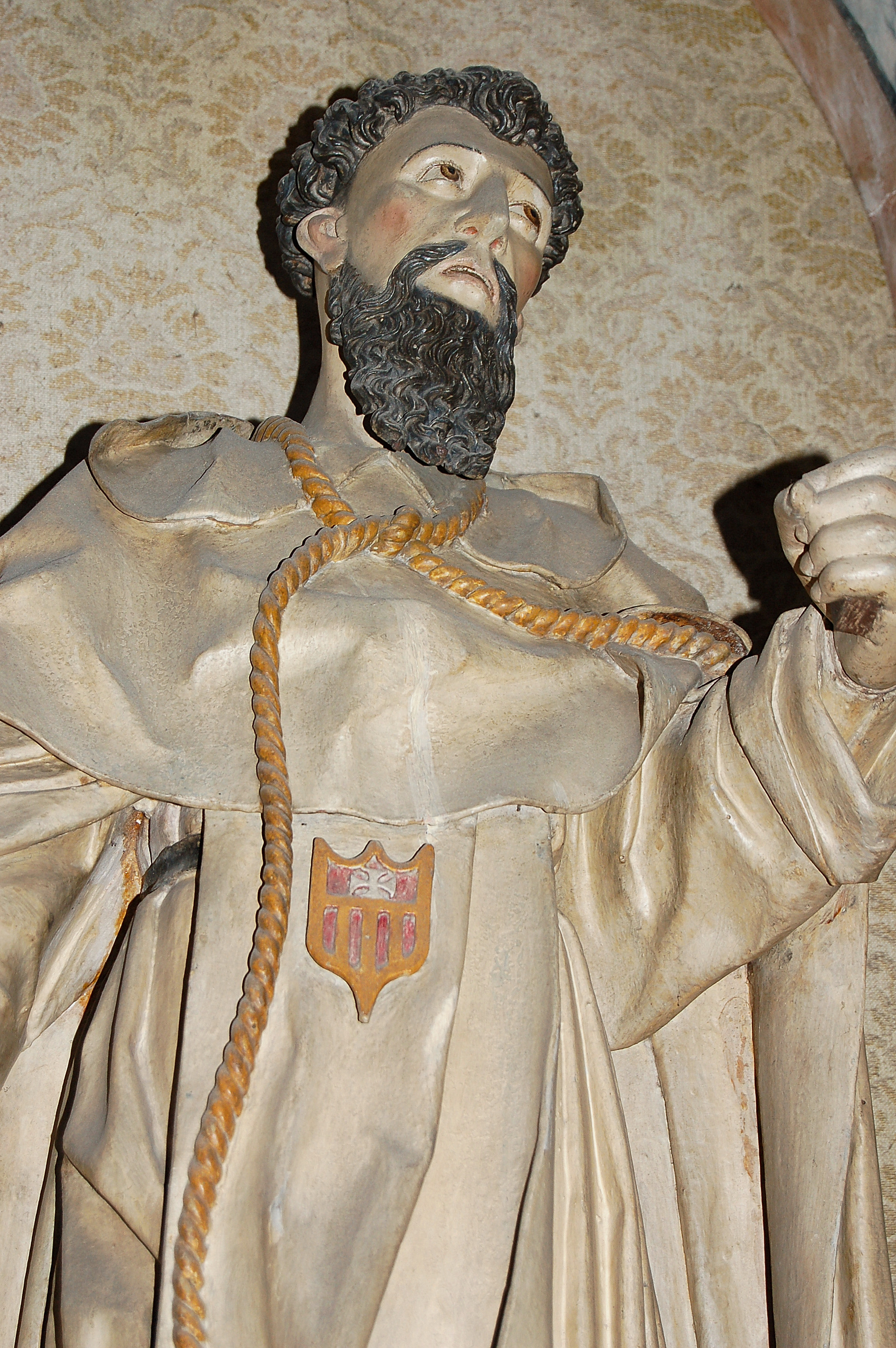
- Statue.

Priest
- Born: c. 1238; Guardia del Prats, Tarragona, Crown of Aragon
- Died: 27 April 1304 (aged 66); Tarragona, Crown of Aragon
- Venerated in: Roman Catholic Church
- Beatified: 28 March 1686, Saint Peter's Basilica, Papal States by Pope Innocent XI
- Canonized: 8 April 1687, Saint Peter's Basilica, Papal States by Pope Innocent XI
- Feast: 27 April (since 1969); 26 April (former)
- Attributes: Mercedarian habit; Rope; Palm of martyrdom
- Patronage: Persecuted Christians

Pedro Armengol (c. 1238 – 27 April 1304), born Pedro Armengol Rocafort, was a Spanish Roman Catholic who was of noble stock and a thief during his adolescence. He became a professed member of the Mercedarians after he experienced a sudden conversion and devoted himself to liberating captive Christians from the Moors. Armengol is best known for being hanged while a captive of the Moors but survived.

He was canonized as a saint on 8 April 1687 after Pope Innocent XI approved his long-standing "cultus" – or devotion.

== Life ==
Pedro Armengol Rocafort was born in La Guàrdia dels Prats in 1238 to the nobleman Arnau Armengol Rocafort. His mother died when Armengol was about eight, and his grief-stricken father immersed himself in his official duties.

The boy became quite proud and strong-willed as an adolescent during which time he became a robber and joined a group of bandits. In 1258 James I of Aragon traveled to Montpellier from Valencia. Armengol's father was a soldier in the entourage. Armengol's bandits collided with the soldiers and father and son soon recognized each other during the skirmish. Armengol surrendered. He was condemned to death, but in light of his father's meritorius service was reprieved.

Later that year he met Peter Nolasco in Barcelona and resolved to become a member of the Mercedarians. After completing the requisite studies, he was ordained a priest and shortly thereafter named a "redeemer", a particularly risky ministry devoted to liberating captive Christians in Moorish Andalusia and north Africa.

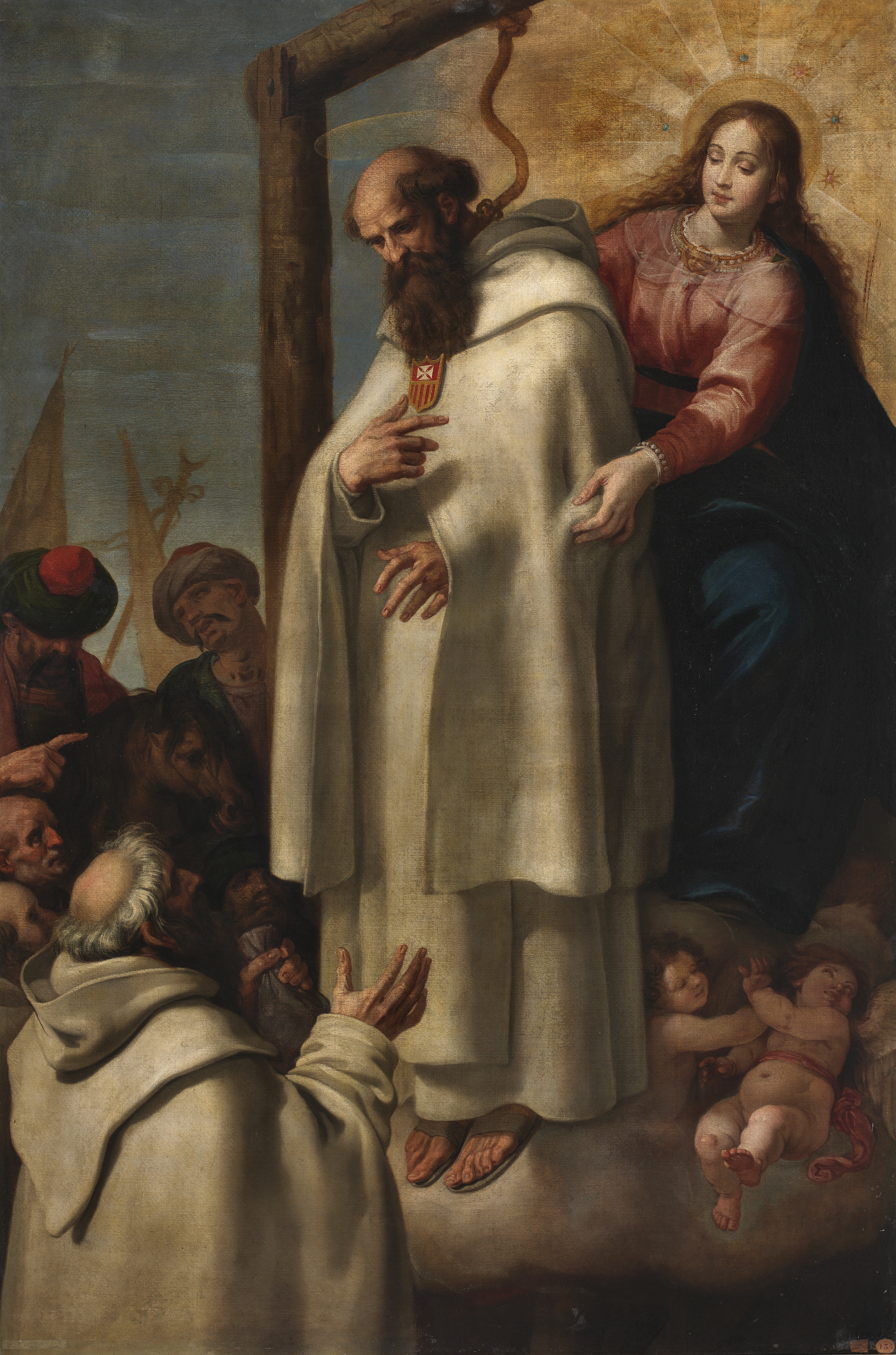
Vicente Carducho's painting depicting the hanging of St. Pedro Armengol and the intervention of the Blessed Mother.

In 1261 with William de Bas he was sent to Murcia and freed 213 captives and in 1262 went to Granada with Br. Bernard of San Romano during which the pair freed 202 prisoners. He visited dungeons, consoled the downhearted, and spent good money buying the freedom of as many as he could. Armengol also went to Algiers in 1264 for the same mission and traveled to Tangier and Oran.

In 1266 he and Guillermo de Florencia ransomed 118 captives at Béjaïa. As they were waiting to embark for Barcelona, they learned of another twenty prepared to convert to Islam in exchange for freedom. They decided that Armengol would stand hostage against the payment of an additional ransom. A year passed and the deadline expired. When the funds did not arrive on time, he was hanged from a tree. Guillermo, having arrived three days late, was told the ransom would not be accepted since Armengol was hanged. He searched for his friend's remains and found him still alive. Armengol attributed his survival to the protection of the Virgin Mary. The pair used the ransom to purchase the freedom of the captives and traveled back to Catalonia.

Armengol spent the rest of his life at the Mercedarian house in his hometown of La Guàrdia dels Prats, where he was father superior in 1291. The attempted execution had a lasting effect on Armengol: it left his neck twisted and his face became quite haggard.

Armengol died on 27 April 1304. In 1646 the church he was buried in was burnt but his remains went undamaged. Minor modifications to his tomb were made in 1653.

== Veneration ==
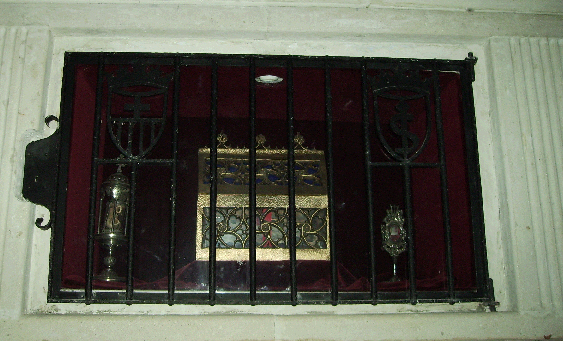
Armengol's tomb

On 3 March 1626, Pope Urban VIII confirmed his long-standing cultus. Pope Innocent XI canonized him as a saint on 8 April 1687. Pope Benedict XIV affixed his feast as being on 27 April – the date of his death – but it was moved in 1969 to 26 April due to the reform of the General Roman Calendar. The Mercedarians and the Diocese of Córdoba retain 27 April.

In iconography he is depicted with a noose around his neck.
