= Basilica of Our Lady of Mercy =

- Basilica of Our Lady of Mercy and Saint Michael the Archangel
- La Mercè
- Basílica de la Mare de Déu de la Mercè
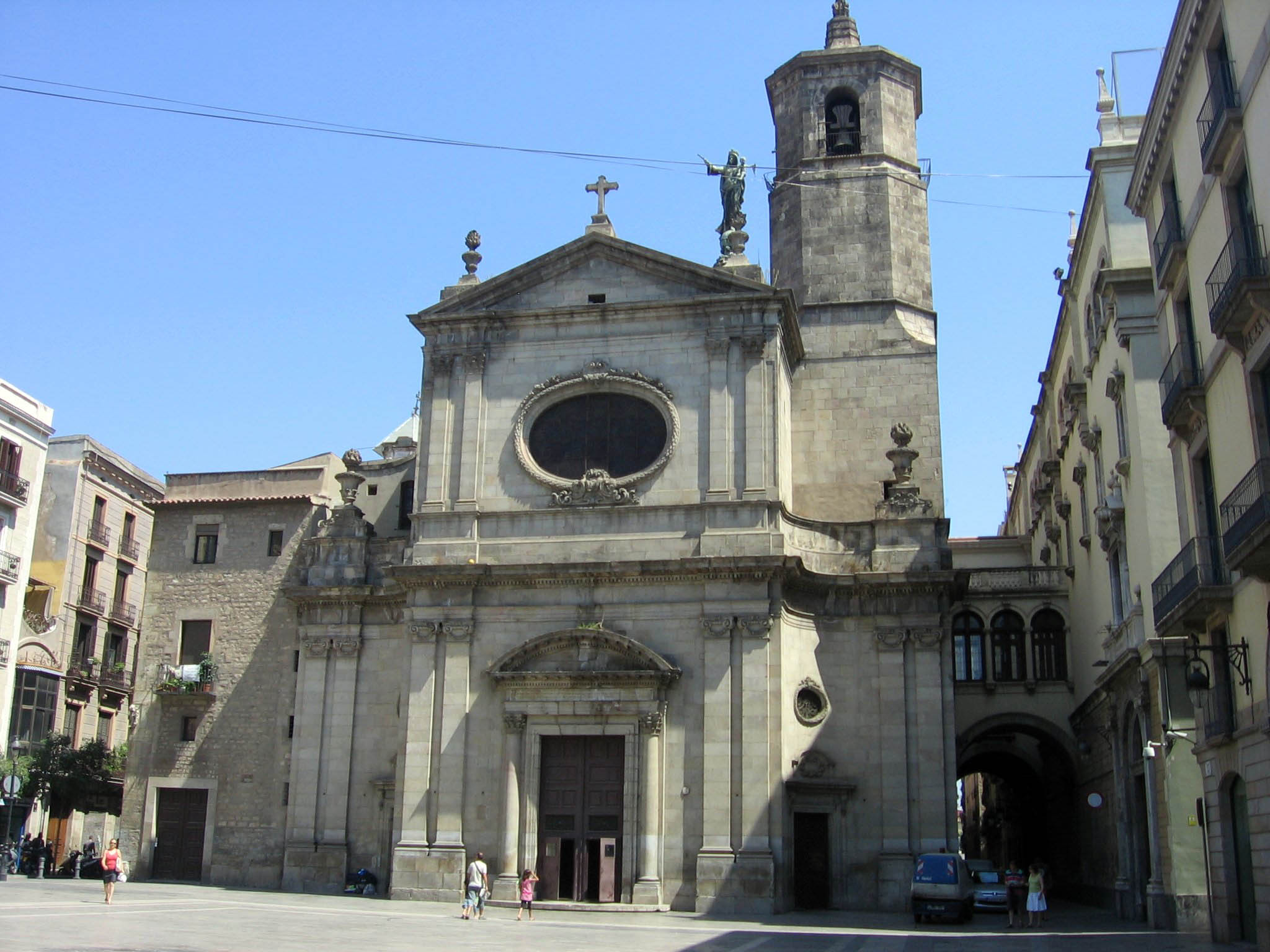

- Location within Barcelona
- 41°22′43.9″N 2°10′44.84″E
- Location: Barcelona
- Country: Spain
- Denomination: Catholic

History
- Status: Basilica
- Dedication: Our Lady of Mercy, Saint Michael the Archangel

Administration
- Archdiocese: Barcelona

The Basilica of Our Lady of Mercy (Catalan: Basílica de la Mercè, Spanish: Basílica de la Merced) is a Baroque-style basilica in Barcelona, Catalonia. Our Lady of Mercy has been the patron saint of the city of Barcelona since 1687.

== History ==
The first church was constructed in 1249. The present structure was built between 1765 and 1775, to a design by Catalan architect Josep Mas i Dordal. The dome of the church is crowned with a statue of Our Lady that is visible from the seaside promenade near the drassanes. This church was the second in Barcelona to receive the title of minor basilica, preceded only by the Barcelona Cathedral. The title was granted in 1918 by Pope Benedict XV, commemorating the seven hundredth anniversary of the apparition of the Virgin to St. Peter Nolasco, founder of the Order of Mercy.

== Links ==
- www.basilicadelamerce.com Official web of Basilica of Our Lady of Mercy
