= Juan Nepomuceno Zegrí Moreno =

Blessed Juan Nepomuceno Zegrí Moreno

Priest
- Born: 11 October 1831; Granada, Kingdom of Spain
- Died: 17 March 1905 (aged 73); Málaga, Kingdom of Spain
- Venerated in: Roman Catholic Church
- Beatified: 9 November 2003, Saint Peter's Square, Vatican City by Pope John Paul II
- Feast: 17 March
- Attributes: Cassock
- Patronage: Mercedarian Sisters of Charity

Juan Nepomuceno Zegrí Moreno (11 October 1831 - 17 March 1905) was a Spanish Roman Catholic priest and the founder of the Mercedarian Sisters of Charity (1878). Moreno was ordained as a priest in 1855 and was accused of misconduct in 1888 and the Holy See ordered him to leave the congregation as an investigation took place; he was vindicated in 1894.

Pope John Paul II presided over Moreno's beatification on 9 November 2003.

== Life ==
Juan Nepomuceno Zegrí Moreno was born in Spain on 11 October 1831 to Antonio de León Zegrí Abril Martín (b. November 1808) and Josefa Moreno Escudero.

His siblings were:

- Francisca Josefa de León Zegrí Moreno
- Antonio Zegrí Moreno
- María Josefa Zegrí Moreno
- María de las Mercedes Zegrí Moreno
- Enriqueta Zegrí Moreno

Juan felt a call to the priesthood during his childhood and he commenced his studies to become a priest at the San Dionisio seminary in Granada. He was ordained as a priest on 2 June 1855 in the Granada Cathedral and became the parish priest at Huétor Santillán and later at San Gabriel de Loja; he also served as a canon of the Málaga Cathedral. Moreno also served as a spiritual director to seminarians and as a preacher and chaplain to Queen Isabel II until her deposition. He went to Málaga following the deposition of the queen and began finalizing his plans for the establishment of a new religious order. Before he was ordained he had been a friend of Bishop Juan Nepomuceno Cascallana Ordóñez.

The order - titled the Mercedarian Sisters of Charity - was founded on 16 March 1878 and was aggregated to the Mercedarians on 9 June 1878. The congregation later received the decree of praise on 25 September 1900 and full papal approval from Pope Leo XIII on 24 April 1901.

Moreno was embroiled in a scandal in 1888 when the religious of his order accused him of misconduct and it resulted in a decree from the Holy See on 7 July 1888 demanding he leave and keep his distance from the congregation. An extensive investigation followed in which Moreno kept silent and adhered to the orders of his superiors until a decree from the Holy See on 15 July 1894 vindicated him of all false allegations. Some sisters however were not inclined to accept this verdict which resulted in some in the order refusing to acknowledge Moreno as its founder.

He died on 17 March 1905. He was re-recognized as the congregation's founder in 1925. His order now operates in nations such as the Dominican Republic and South Korea and as of 2005 had 1234 religious in a total of 156 houses.

== Beatification ==
The beatification process opened in an informative process that spanned from 5 July 1958 until it was closed on 7 June 1962. The formal opening of the cause on 5 July 1958 under Pope Pius XII conferred the title of Servant of God upon the late priest. The Congregation for the Causes of Saints validated the process in Rome on 7 February 1992. The C.C.S. received the Positio at the beginning of 1993 and passed it onto a board of historians who granted their assent to the continuation of the cause on 26 January 1993. Theologians approved it on 14 November 2000 and the C.C.S. also approved it on 4 December 2001.

Moreno was declared to be Venerable on 20 December 2001 after Pope John Paul II recognized that he had lived a life of heroic virtue.

The miracle required for beatification was investigated and later received C.C.S. validation in Rome on 12 February 1993 which allowed for a team of medical experts to approve the miracle in a meeting on 18 April 2002 and for theologians to follow suit on 18 October 2002. The C.C.S. voted in favor of the miracle on 7 January 2003 and the pope himself did so as well on 12 April 2003.

John Paul II beatified Moreno on 9 November 2003.
