= Maria de Cervelló =

Catholic saint and superior of the Third Order of Mercedarians

Saint Maria de Cervelló
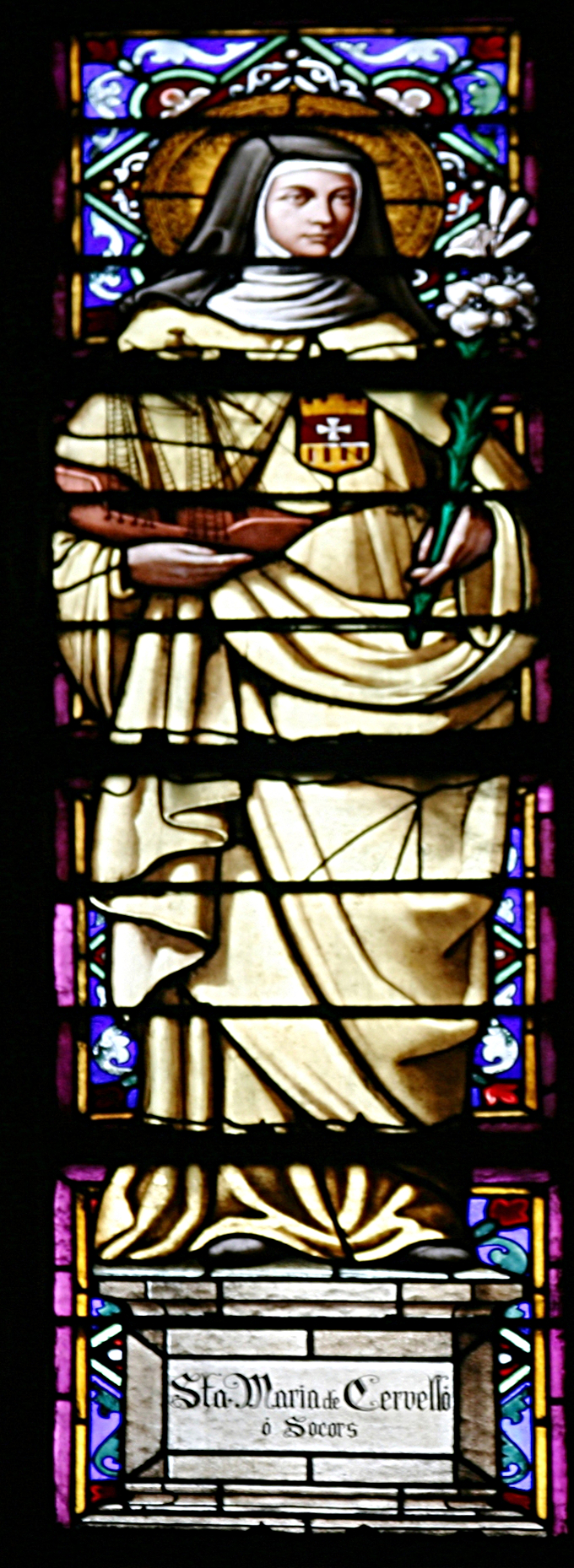
- Stained glass window of the saint
- Born: December 1, 1230; Barcelona
- Hometown: Barcelona
- Died: September 19, 1290 (aged 59); Barcelona
- Venerated in: Roman Catholic Church
- Canonized: 15 February 1692 by Pope Innocent XII
- Major shrine: Basilica of Our Lady of Mercy
- Feast: 19 September
- Attributes: Lily, boat, stormy sea
- Patronage: Navigators

Maria de Cervelló (Mary de Cervellione, Mary of Cervellon) (1230 – 19 September 1290) was a Catalan superior of the Third Order of Mercedarians. She is a Catholic saint; her veneration, which began immediately after her death, was approved by Pope Innocent XII in 1692.

She is invoked especially against shipwreck and is generally represented with a ship in her hand. Her feast is celebrated on 19 September. On account of her charity towards the needy she began to be called Maria de Socos (Mary of Help).

== Life ==
Born at Barcelona, she was the daughter of a Spanish nobleman named William de Cervellon. She was baptized on December 8 in Santa Maria del Mar. Mary de Cervellione assisted at the Hospital of Saint Eulalia, which had been built largely through the generosity of Raimundo de Plagamans, a wealthy businessman in the royal service; and was located at Villanova by the sea.

The Mercedarians had for time been involved in redeeming Christian slaves and captives held by the Saracens of Spain and North Africa. Through her work at the hospital, Mary came into contact with Peter Nolasco, founder of the Mercedarians. One day she heard a sermon preached by Bernardo de Corbera, the superior of the Brotherhood of Our Lady of Ransom at Barcelona and was so deeply affected that she resolved to do all in her power for those held captive. Despite her families repeated attempts to arrange a socially advantageous marriage, with the assistance of Bernado, in 1265 she joined a little community of pious women who lived near the monastery of the Mercedarians and spent their lives in prayer and good works.

They obtained permission to constitute a Third Order of Our Lady of Ransom (de Mercede) and to wear the habit of the Brotherhood of Our Lady of Ransom. In addition to the usual vows of tertiaries, they promised to pray for the Christian slaves. Mary was elected the first superior.

Although the sisters devoted themselves to prayer, they were not a contemplative order. Mary de Cervellione continued to work at Saint Eulalia's, where the ransomed stayed once they returned. Because of her devotion to the poor and those in need she was called "Maria de Socos" (Mary of Help). She was credited, both before and after her death, with coming to the aid of ships in danger at sea so they might continue on course to safely deliver Christian prisoners.

She died on September 19, 1290.

== Veneration ==
Her cult was approved by Pope Innocent XII in 1692. Her remains lie in the Basilica of La Merced in Barcelona. She is depicted as holding a ship.
