= James William Brodman =

American medievalist (born 1945)

James William Brodman (born 1945) is an American medievalist whose scholarship focuses on the social and religious history of medieval Europe, particularly the Iberian Peninsula. He is professor emeritus of medieval history at the University of Central Arkansas (UCA), where he spent most of his academic career.

Brodman's research has examined captivity and ransom, poverty, hospitals, charity, and social welfare in medieval Iberia and Europe. His books are Ransoming Captives in Crusader Spain: The Order of Merced on the Christian-Islamic Frontier (1986), Charity and Welfare: Hospitals and the Poor in Medieval Catalonia (1998), and Charity and Religion in Medieval Europe (2009).

== Education and career ==
Brodman received a BA from Canisius University and a MA and PhD in history from the University of Virginia, where he studied under Charles Julian Bishko. He spent the majority of his academic career as a professor of medieval history at the University of Central Arkansas (UCA), retiring at the end of 2011. He holds the title of Professor Emeritus.

== Research ==
Brodman's research focuses on religion and social policy in the Middle Ages. His first book was Ransoming Captives in Crusader Spain: The Order of Merced on the Christian-Islamic Frontier (1986). According to the Hispanic American Historical Review, the book places the activities of the Mercedarians within the broader development of popular Christian piety and charitable activity.

His next book, Charity and Welfare: Hospitals and the Poor in Medieval Catalonia (1998), focused on the history of poverty and care. A review in The Catholic Historical Review describes the book as an account of the evolution of social welfare in medieval Spain, emphasizing hospitals and charity as both Christian social action and secular duty. A review in Speculum notes that medieval hospitals provided relatively little medical care and instead concentrated on food and shelter for the poor.

Brodman's third book, Charity and Religion in Medieval Europe (2009), broadened his research across geographical areas and institutions and examined the relationship between charity and religion in the Middle Ages. The book discusses charitable activity by both religious institutions and laypeople. Brodman also challenges the emphasis placed by social historians on the poor as a category of analysis, arguing that they were often passive recipients of religiously motivated charity.

== Professional activities ==
Brodman served as president of the American Academy of Research Historians of Medieval Spain and founded the Library of Iberian Resources Online (LIBRO), a digital initiative intended to make scholarship on medieval Iberia freely accessible to researchers.

== Personal life ==
Brodman is married to Marian Masiuk Brodman and has two children, James Christopher Brodman and Margaret Marian Brodman.

== Publications (selected) ==
1. Brodman, James. “The Mystery of Mary: Patronal Transformation in the Order of Mercy,” in Els Turquets d’Algar. La redempció de captius per l’Ordre dels Mercedaris al Camp de Morvedre. I Jornades internacionals d’historia a Algar de Palància. Edited by María Julia Martínez García et al. Algar: Ajuntament d’Algar de Palància, 2018, 117-26.
2. Brodman, James. “The Siete Partidas and the Law of Charity in Thirteenth-Century Castile,” in The Emergence of León-Castile, c. 1085-1500, ed. James J. Todesca. Farmham, England: Ashgate, 2015, 81-91.
3. Brodman, James. “New Perspectives on the Creation of the Mercedarian Order,” in Maria Teresa FERRER MALLOL (ed.). Jaume I. Commemoració del VIII centenari del naixement de Jaume I. Volume 2: L’economia rural. L’articulació urbana. Les institucions eclesiàstiques. L’expansió territorial. El comerç. Barcelona: Institut d’Estudis Catalans, 2013, 389-399.
4. Brodman, James. “Captives or Prisoners: Society and Obligation in Medieval Iberia,” Anuario de la Historia de Iglesia, 20 (2011): 201-19.
5. Brodman, James. “Hospitals in the Middle Ages,” in A Companion to the Medieval World, ed. Edward English and Carol Lansing (Oxford: Wiley-Blackwell, 2009), 257-75.
6. Brodman, James. “Religion and Discipline in the Hospitals of Medieval France,” in The Medieval Hospital and Medical Practice, ed. Barbara Bowers. Aldershot, England: Ashgate Publishing, 2007, 123-32.
7. Brodman, James. “Unequal in Charity? Women and Hospitals in Medieval Catalonia,” Medieval Encounters, 12 (2006): 26-36.
8. Brodman, James. “Rule and Identity: The Case of the Military Orders,” The Catholic Historical Review, 87 (2001), 383-400.
9. Brodman, James. "What is a Soul Worth? Pro anima Bequests in the Municipal Legislation of Reconquest Spain," Medievalia et Humanistica, 20 (1994): 15-23.
10. Brodman, James. "Exceptis militibus et sanctis: Restrictions upon Ecclesiastical Ownership of Land in the Foral Legislation of Medieval Castile and Valencia," En la España medieval, 15 (1992): 63-75.
11. Brodman, James. "Municipal Ransoming Law on the Medieval Spanish Frontier," Speculum, 60 (1985): 318-30.
