= Virgin of Mercy =

Depiction of the Virgin Mary sheltering a group using her outspread cloak

The Virgin of Mercy (also known as Our Lady of Mercy or the Madonna della Misericordia) is a major title and artistic motif in Christian tradition that represents the Virgin Mary as a protective, compassionate intercessor who shelters humanity beneath her outspread cloak.

Core Meanings and Themes

- The Sheltering Mantle: In Christian art (especially popular from the 13th to 16th centuries in Italy, Spain, and Latin America), Mary is shown standing with her arms outspread, holding open a large cloak or pallium to shield a group of kneeling people—such as monks, nuns, civic leaders, or ordinary faithful—from divine wrath or worldly harm.
- Compassion and Grace: The title derives from terms like merced or misericordia, meaning mercy, clemency, or unearned grace. In theology, Mary is viewed as the one who brings Christ (Mercy Incarnate) into the world and intercedes for sinners.
- Liberation of Captives: The devotion is closely linked to Saint Peter Nolasco, who founded the Mercedarian Order (Order of the Blessed Virgin Mary of Mercy) in Barcelona in 1218 after a vision of Mary. The order was dedicated to rescuing Christian captives held in bondage, leading to depictions of Mary holding broken chains, shackles, or a white habit.
- Patronage and Feast Day: She is the patron saint of places like Barcelona (celebrated during the La Mercè festival), Cuba, and the Dominican Republic. Her primary feast day is September 24.

The Virgin of Mercy is a subject in Christian art, showing a group of people sheltering for protection under the outspread cloak, or pallium, of the Virgin Mary. It was especially popular in Italy from the 13th to 16th centuries, often as a specialised form of votive portrait; it is also found in other countries and later art, especially Spain and Latin America. Usually the Virgin is standing alone, though if angels hold up the cloak, she is free to hold the infant Christ. She is typically about twice the size of the other figures. The people sheltered normally kneel, and are of necessity shown usually at a much smaller scale. These may represent all members of Christian society, with royal crowns, mitres and a papal tiara in the front rows, or represent the local population. The subject was often commissioned by specific groups such as families, confraternities, guilds or convents or abbeys, and then the figures represent these specific groups, as shown by their dress, or by the 15th century individual portraits. Sometimes arrows rain down from above, which the cloak prevents from reaching the people.

== Other languages ==
In Italian it is known as the Madonna della Misericordia (Madonna of Mercy), in German as the Schutzmantelmadonna (Sheltering-cloak Madonna), in Spanish as the Virgen de la Merced or Nuestra Señora de la Misericordia (Virgin of Mercy), in French as the Notre-Dame de la Merci (Our Lady of Mercy), in Polish as the Matka Boża Miłosierdzia (Mother of God of Mercy), in Portuguese as the Nossa Senhora das Mercês, in Catalan as the Mare de Déu de la Mercè and in Greek as the Παναγιά του ἐλέους.

== Pictorial tradition in Christian art ==
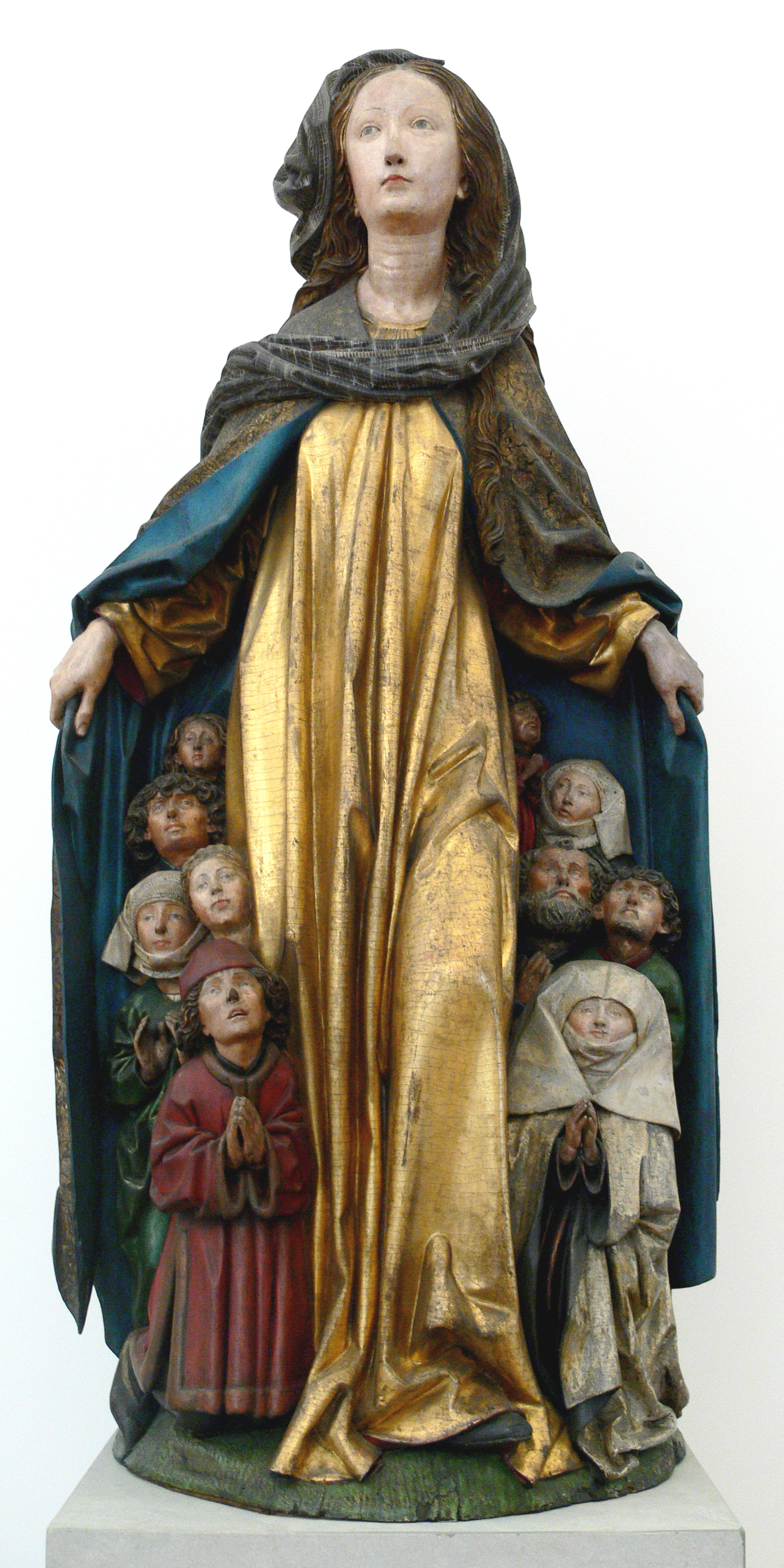
The Ravensburger Schutzmantelmadonna, c. 1480, attributed to Michel Erhart, painted limewood, Bode Museum, Berlin.

Probably the oldest version known is a small panel by Duccio of c. 1280, with three Franciscan friars under the cloak, in the Pinacoteca in Siena. Here the Virgin sits, only one side of the cloak is extended, and the Virgin holds her child on her knee with her other hand.

A miniature of c. 1274 from the Armenian Kingdom of Cilicia also shows a variant of the motif, as do 13th century paintings in Cyprus, such as an icon in the Byzantine Museum in the Archbishop's Palace, Nicosia.

The common factor between all these is the influence and presence of Western mendicant orders, especially the Franciscans, who appear to have been important in spreading this form of iconography.

The immediate inspiration of the iconography comes from a vision reported in the Dialogus Miraculorum of the Cistercian Caesarius of Heisterbach which circulated widely from about 1230. Beyond that, the origins of the image may relate to rituals and a vision or miracle connected with a famous icon in the Blachernae Church in Constantinople.

This gave rise in the Byzantine Rite (Eastern Orthodox and Eastern Catholic Churches) to the Pokrov icons, although the image is not found in Byzantine art. In the Pokrov icons the thought is similar, but the image is usually less literal – the veil with which the Virgin protects mankind is small and held either in her hands or by two angels, though the Western version with a larger cloak is found in some Eastern Orthodox icons, one of a number of Western iconographic features that influenced Orthodox art, whether in Cyprus under the Crusaders or 16th-century Eastern Europe.

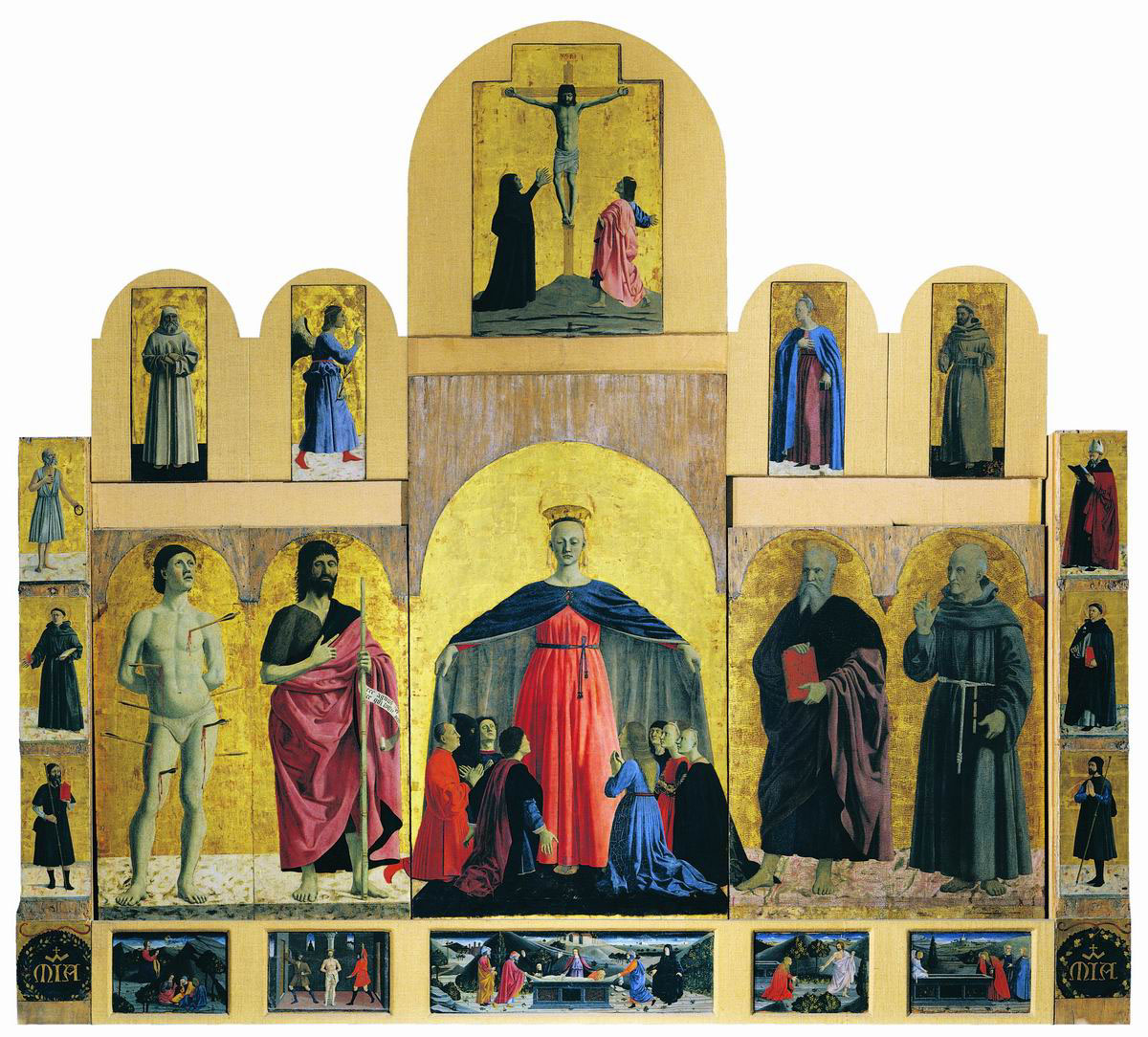
Misericorde altarpiece

The image also fits well with the words of the ancient hymn Sub tuum praesidium, probably composed in the 3rd century, and used in most pre-Reformation churches of both the Western and Eastern churches.

Usually the image, whether in sculpture or painting, stands by itself. Nevertheless, in the most famous example, the Madonna della Misericordia altarpiece (1445–1462) in Sansepolcro by Piero della Francesca, the subject is the central panel of a large altarpiece, with a smaller Crucifixion above it, and many other panels.

The image came in for special derision from Martin Luther, who compared it to "a hen with her chicks".

In the Spanish The Virgin of the Navigators of the 1530s, where those sheltered are a group connected with the Spanish voyages to the New World, including American indigenous peoples, the group is shown over a panorama of ships at rest in a harbour.

In Germany during the Middle Ages, an almost identical image was used featuring Saint Ursula, usually holding her attribute of an arrow to avoid confusion.

In this pictorial tradition, also the iconography of the Works of mercy alludes sometimes to the Virgin of Mercy, such as Caravaggio in his huge painting in Naples, because in 1606/07 it was commissioned for the church of the Confraternita del Pio Monte della Misericordia.

== Veneration ==
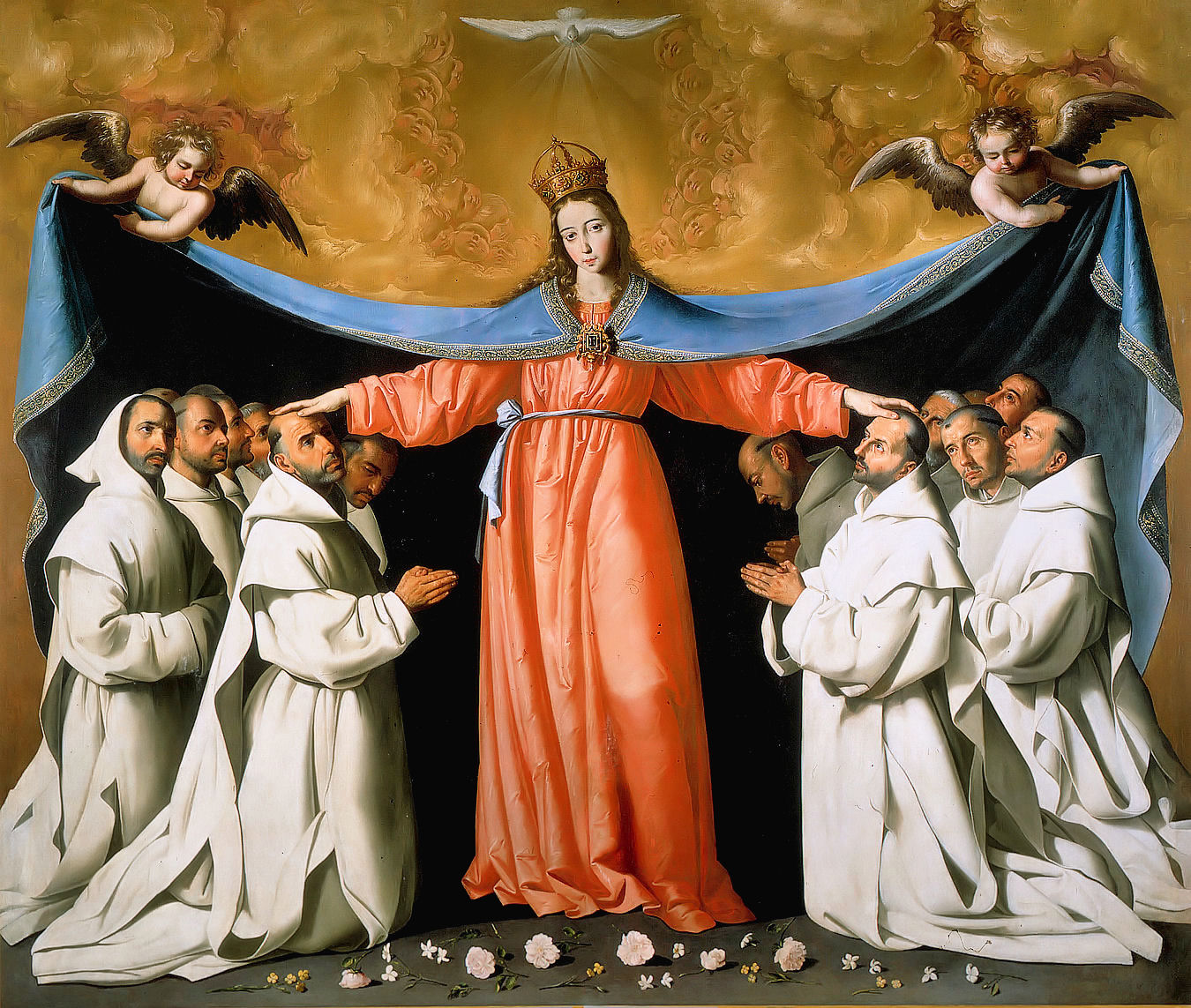
Zurbarán, 17th century Spanish, with a group of monks

The liturgical feast day of Our Lady of Mercy is celebrated annually in the General Roman Calendar on September 24.

Our Lady of Mercy is the co-patroness, along with St. Mark, of the Roman Catholic Diocese of Venice in Florida.

Churches dedicated to her include the cathedral of Guasdualito in Venezuela and the National Shrine of La Virgen de las Mercedes, also known as "El Santo Cerro" in La Vega, Dominican Republic.

== Other contexts ==
The term "Virgin of Mercy" is found in a number of other contexts not directly related to the image. It is a common translation of the Eleusa type of icon of the Virgin and Child.

The Virgin of Mercy is patron saint of Barcelona, celebrated in the week-long La Mercè festival each year, but in this role is not especially associated with this type of image. The Order of the Blessed Virgin Mary of Mercy, founded, also in Barcelona, in 1218 by Saint Peter Nolasco, has used the image but is not particularly associated with it.

In Santería, the Virgin of Mercy is syncretized with Obatala.

== See also ==
- Congregation of the Sisters of Our Lady of Mercy
- Consecration and entrustment to Mary
- Madonna (art)
- Mary Untier of Knots
- Order of the Blessed Virgin Mary of Mercy (Our Lady of Ransom)
- Our Lady
- Eastern Theotokos Pokrova depictions
- Mother of the Church
- Cincture of the Theotokos
