= Mercedarians (1218) =

Roman Catholic religious mendicant order

Royal, Celestial and Military Order of Our Lady of Mercy and the Redemption of Captives
- Ordo Beatae Mariae de Mercede redemptionis captivorum
- Abbreviation: O.de M.
- Formation: 1218
- Type: Catholic religious order
- Headquarters: Santa Maria della Mercede e Sant'Adriano; Via Monte Carmelo 3, 00166 Rome, Italy
- Master General: Juan Carlos Saavedra Lucho (2016–present)
- Key people: Peter Nolasco, founder
- Website: Mercedarian Friars, 2

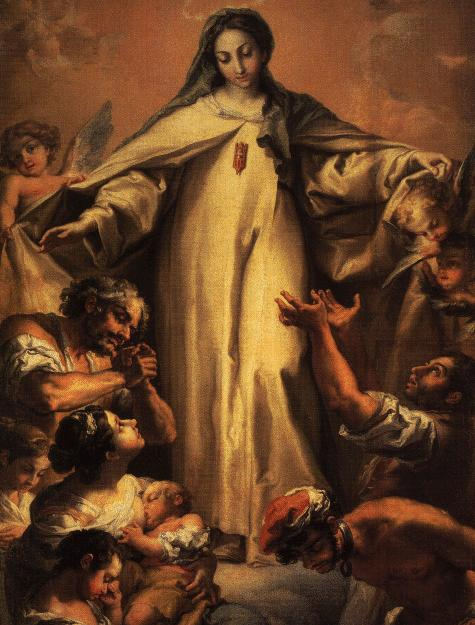
Our Lady of Mercy – From the Generalate of the Mercedarian Order.

The Royal, Celestial and Military Order of Our Lady of Mercy and the Redemption of the Captives (Latin: Ordo Beatae Mariae de Mercede Redemptionis Captivorum, abbreviated O. de M.), also known as the Mercedarians, is a Catholic mendicant order. Tradition places its foundation in 1218 by Peter Nolasco in the city of Barcelona, at that time the capital of the Principality of Catalonia, part of the Crown of Aragon, for the redemption of Christian captives. Its members are most commonly known as Mercedarian friars or nuns. By the fifteenth century century its members took a so-called fourth vow: to die, if necessary, for a Christian captive who is in danger of losing their faith. The Order exists today in 17 countries.

== General background ==
Between the eighth and the fifteenth centuries, medieval Europe was in a state of intermittent warfare between the Christian kingdoms of southern Europe and the Muslim polities of North Africa, Southern France, Sicily and Moorish portions of Spain. According to James William Brodman, the threat of capture, whether by pirates or coastal raiders, or during one of the region's intermittent wars, was a continuous threat to residents of Catalonia, Languedoc and the other coastal provinces of medieval Christian Europe. Raids by militias, bands and armies from both sides were an almost annual occurrence.

For over 600 years, these constant armed confrontations produced numerous war prisoners on both sides. Islam's captives were reduced to the state of slaves since they were considered war booty. In the lands of Visigothic Spain, both Christian and Muslim societies had become accustomed to the buying and selling of captives, so much so that tenth-century Andalusian merchants formed caravans to purchase slaves in Eastern Europe. In the thirteenth century, in addition to spices, slaves constituted one of the goods of the flourishing trade between Christian and Muslim ports.

Starting before the First Crusade, many hospices and hospitals were organized by the chapters of cathedrals or by the monastic orders. Within the communal organizations of towns, local charitable institutions such as almshouses were established by confraternities or guilds, or by successful individual laymen.

Broader-based and aristocratically-funded charitable institutions were more prominent, and the episodes of aristocratic and even royal ransom and its conditions, were the subject of chronicle and romance. The Order of the Most Holy Trinity and of the Captives was founded in France in 1198 by Felix of Valois and John of Matha to ransom Christians held captive.

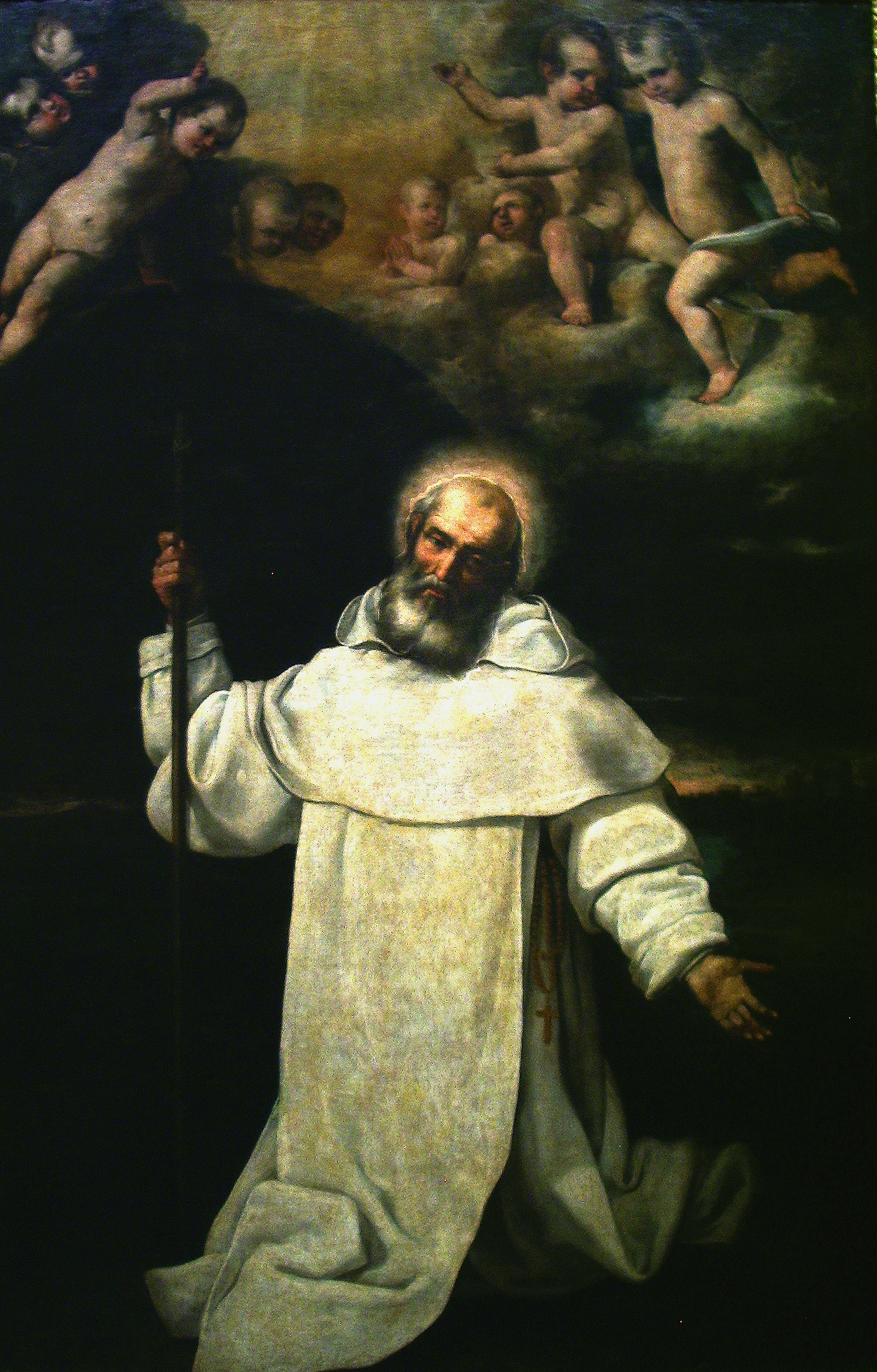
Peter Nolasco (1189-1256)

== Peter Nolasco ==
Sources for the origins of the Mercedarians are scant and almost nothing is known of the founder, Peter Nolasco. Biographers agree that, at some point in his youth, Nolasco became concerned with the plight of Christians captured in Moorish raids and that he decided to establish a religious order to succor these unfortunates. Nolasco began ransoming Christian captives in 1203. After fifteen years of work, he and his friends saw that the number of captives was growing day by day. His plan was to establish a well-structured and stable redemptive religious order under the patronage of Blessed Mary.

== Foundation of the Order ==
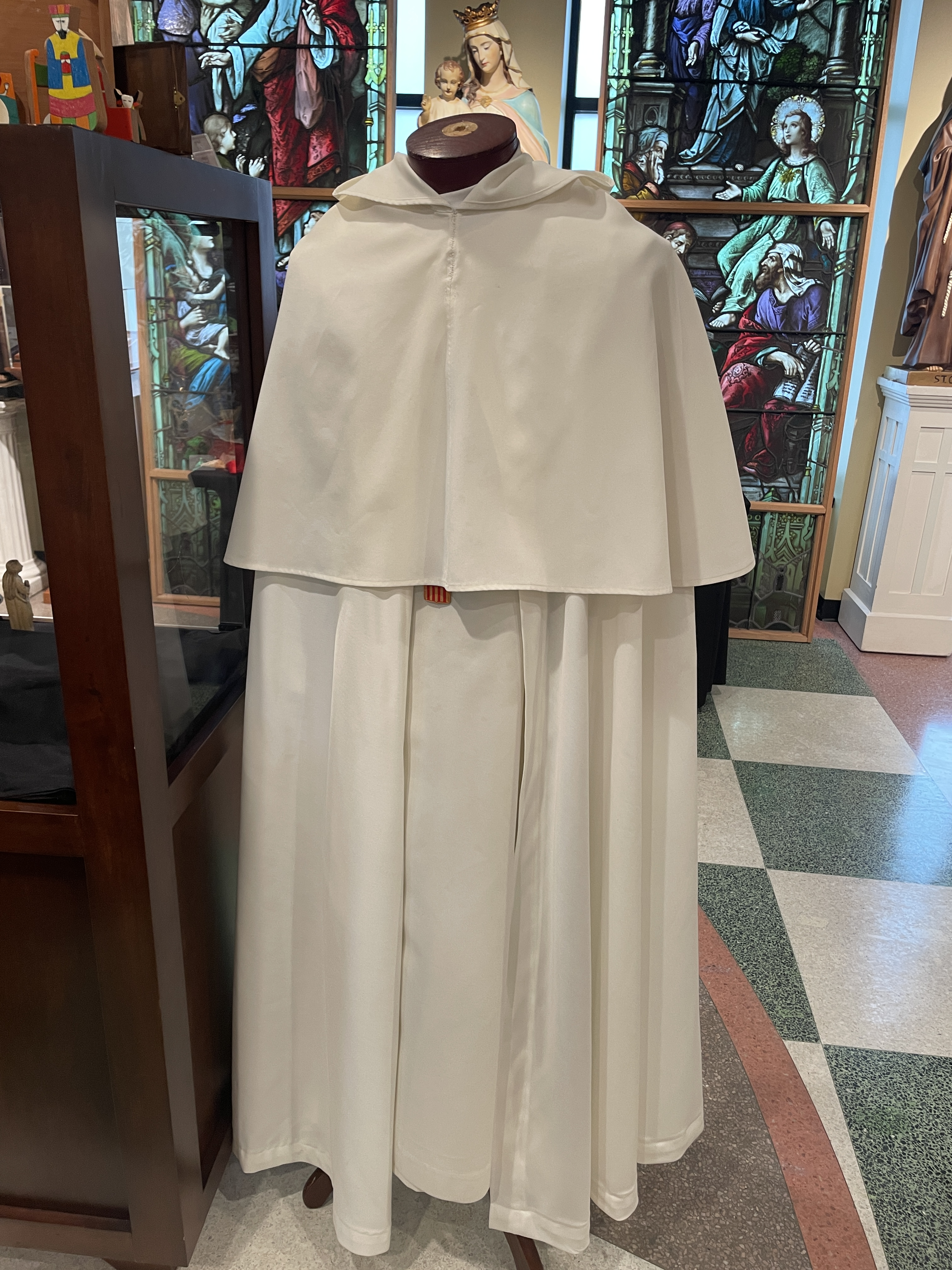
The habit of the Mercedarian order.

The Order of the Blessed Virgin Mary of Mercy (or the Order of Merced, O.Merc., Mercedarians, the Order of Captives, or the Order of Our Lady of Ransom) was one of many dozens of associations that sprang up in Europe during the 12th and 13th centuries as institutions of charitable works. The work of the Mercedarians was in ransoming impoverished captive Christians (slaves) held in Muslim hands, especially along the frontier that the Crown of Aragon shared with al-Andalus (Muslim Spain).

The Order of Mercy, an early 13th century popular movement of personal piety organized at first by Nolasco, was concerned with ransoming the ordinary men who had not the means to negotiate their own ransom, the "poor of Christ".

=== Hagiographic tradition ===
From the year 1192 certain noblemen of Barcelona had formed a confraternity for the purpose of caring for the sick in hospitals, and also for rescuing Christian captives from the Moors. Tradition has it that around 1218, Nolasco and King James I of Aragon each experienced separately a vision of the Virgin Mary, who asked them to found a religious order dedicated to rescuing the many Christian captives held by the Muslims. Nolasco's confessor, Raymond of Penyafort, a Dominican friar and former canon of Barcelona, encouraged and assisted him in this project; and King James also extended his protection.

On August 10, 1218, the new religious order for the Redemption of Captives was officially constituted at the main altar erected over Eulalia of Barcelona's tomb in the Cathedral of the Holy Cross (also known as the Cathedral of Santa Eulalia) in Barcelona. Bishop Berenguer de Palou gave Nolasco and his companions the white religious habit that they would wear as characteristic of the Order; he put them under the Rule of Saint Augustine as a norm for their life in common and he gave his authorization for the sign of his cathedral, the Holy Cross, to be on the habit of the Order. After that, Nolasco and the first Mercedarians made their religious profession there before the bishop. Their headquarters was the Monastery of St. Eulalia of Barcelona, which served as the first Mercedarian convent and as a house of welcome for redeemed captives.

=== Documentary records ===
Reconstructing the Order's beginnings from the documentary record produces a far less detailed story. In this, the year 1218 plays no role. The founder first appears ca. 1226 as a collector of alms in Perpignan. By 1230 he was collecting alms for captives in Barcelona as the head of a small lay confraternity. On August 12, 1230, Maimó Gombal, a resident of Barcelona and a man of some property, directed in his will that 100 Papal States scudi be handed over to Nolasco for the ransoming of captives. The bequest was not unusual, either in amount or intent, for Catalans of this era frequently included this pious good work in their testaments. What sets this particular bequest apart is that it contains the first notice of the redeeming work of Nolasco. Nothing is known about him before his appearance in Maimó's will and only very little afterwards.

During the next six years, the confraternity slowly evolves into a religious order, as members obtain properties in Catalonia. While Nolasco, by all accounts, first established his movement at Barcelona and then on Mallorca, its first acquisitions of note were in the Kingdom of Valencia. Here special circumstances associated with the frontier —an abundance of new land awaiting Christian settlement and an arena for the practice of charitable ransoming— created an ideal environment for the new Order. Consequently, the preponderance of what Mercedarians came to possess here were lands donated by the king, successful crusaders and other patrons.

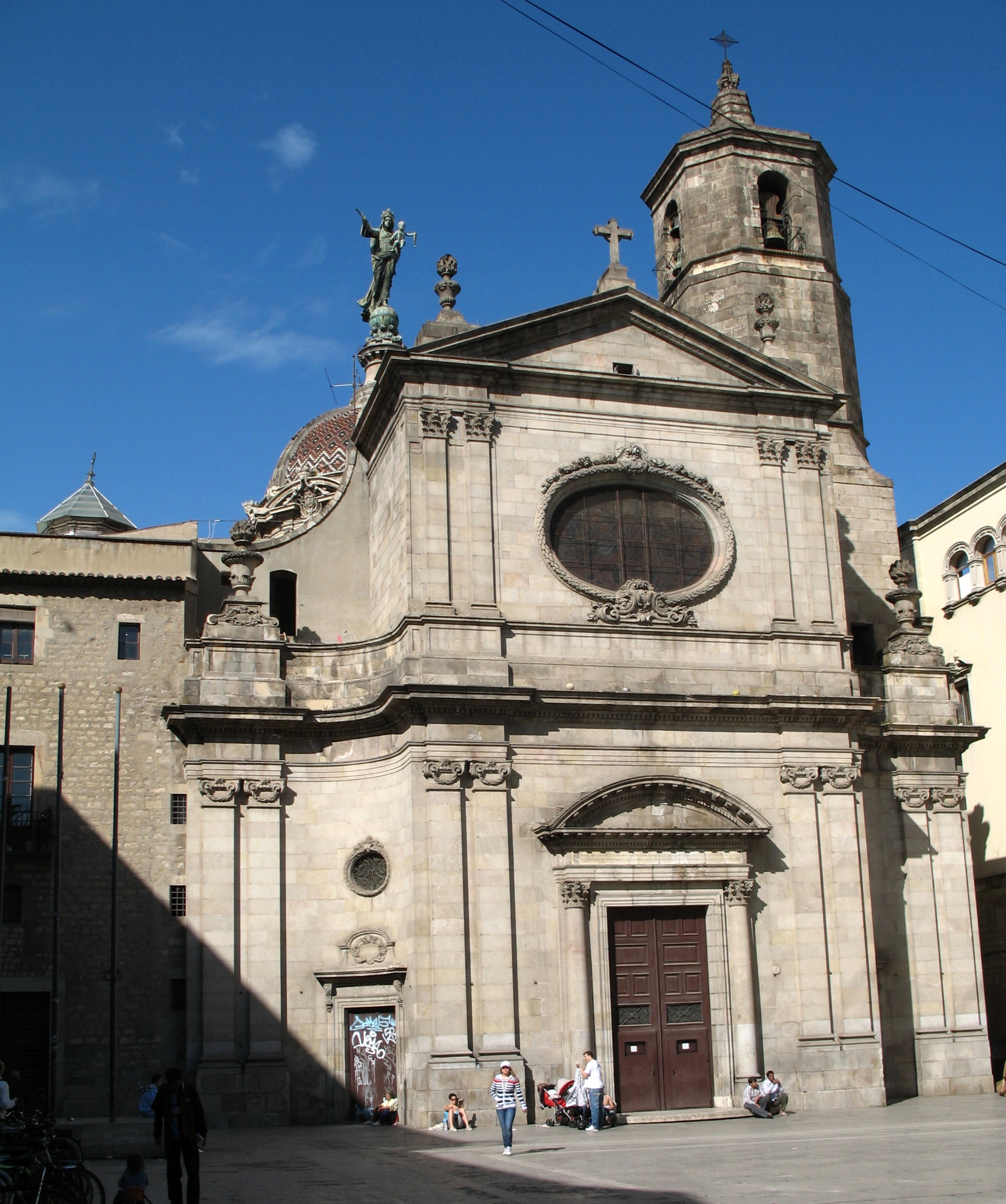
La Mercè basilica in Barcelona where the Mercedarian mother church, current building built between 1765 and 1775.

In 1236, Pope Gregory IX granted the Mercedarians formal recognition as a religious order under the old Rule of St. Augustine. The small order gained additional members, property and support in the 1250s and 1260s. While evidence is scant, one has to assume that this support came in recognition of the Order's work in ransoming captives in a war zone that remained quite active. The growing pains, however, also caused institutional turmoil, whose outlines can only be glimpsed. The visible result was a reorganization in 1272 by a new master, Pere d'Amer.

James I, whose descendants claimed him to be the Mercedarian founder, had in fact no documented contact with the Order until the late 1230s and early 1240s, at which time he granted formerly Muslim lands in Valencia, especially the Shrine of Santa Maria del Puig, patron saint of the kingdom. It was not until the 1250s that royal patronage becomes evident, when the king granted the Order his guidaticum (a form of diplomatic protection), economic privileges that promoted gifts to the Order, and, at least temporarily, the important shrine of St. Vincent in the City of Valencia. Claims by King James II and Peter IV of a royal foundation of the Order reflected not real history but their own designs upon the Order's financial resources and personnel.

In 1265 a second order of Mercedarians for women was founded in Spain by St. Mary de Cervellione.

=== Constitutions of the Mercedarian Order ===
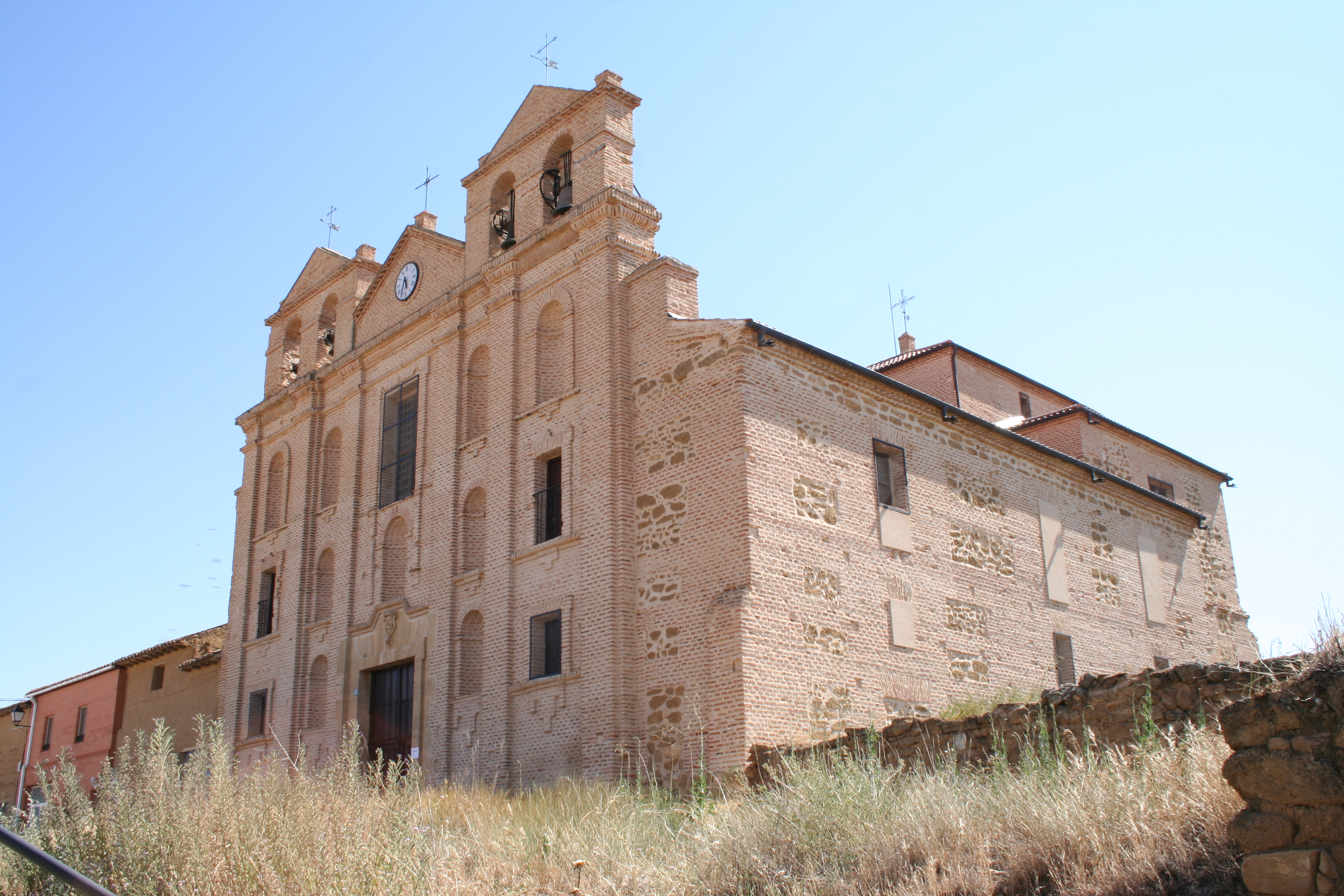
Convento de la Merced, founded in 1607, is a Merecedarian convent, which now serves as a church, in the small town of Valdunquillo, in northern Castile.

In the preface of the first Constitutions of the Mercedarian Order of 1272, three key elements referring to the foundation stand out: the name, the founder and the purpose of the Order.

The name with which the Order founded by Nolasco is identified, is mentioned first. Prior to the 1272 Constitutions, the Order had several names among which: Order of Saint Eulalia, Order of the Mercy of Captives, Order of the Redemption of Captives, Order of Mercy. Those of 1272 established a dual patronage: The Order of the Virgin Mary of the Ransom of Captives of St. Eulalia of Barcelona. But the proper and definitive title is: Order of the Virgin Mary of Mercy of the Redemption of Captives. This name, however, does not come into general use until the 1290s and is not codified until the Albertine Constitutions of 1327.

The 1272 Constitutions, further, establish Nolasco as the Order's founder:he has been constituted "servant, messenger, founder and promoter" of the new Institute. Peter Nolasco is the real founder of the Order or the "Procurator of the alms of captives" as defined on March 28, 1219, by the first document referring to him.

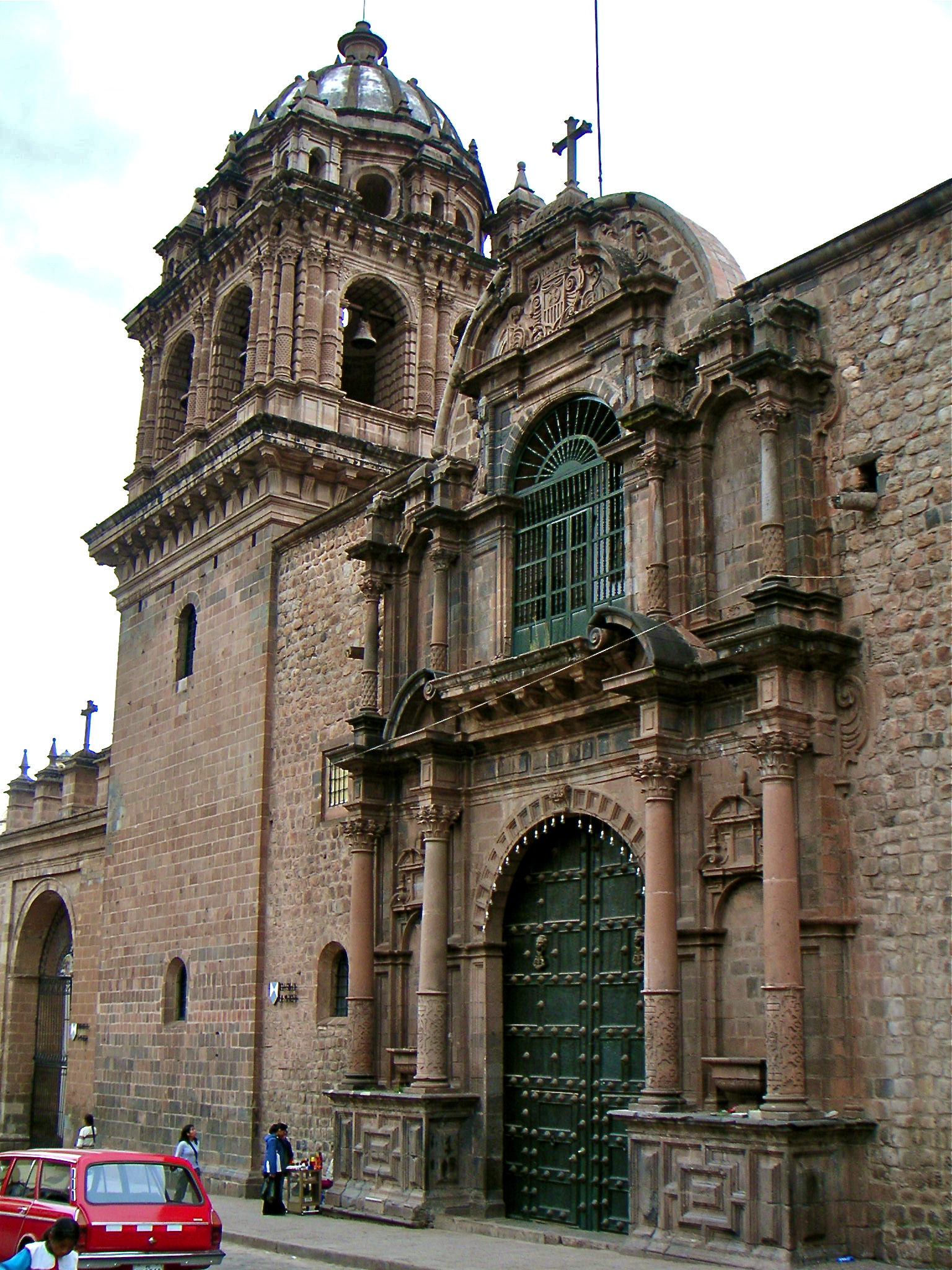
Basilica of La Merced in Cusco, Peru, built between 1651 and 1696.

Finally, it is clearly specified that the purpose of the Order is "to visit and to free Christians who are in captivity and in power of the Saracens or of other enemies of our Law… By this work of mercy… all the brothers of this Order, as sons of true obedience, must always be gladly disposed to give up their lives, if it is necessary, as Jesus Christ gave up his for us."

== Reform ==
In the 15th century, a movement grew up among the monasteries of the Order seeking a stricter lifestyle, keeping more exactly the Rule of St. Augustine under which the friars live. This spread and gained approval by the Master General of the Order. As a result of the Counter-Reformation, spurred by the Council of Trent (1545-1563), this goal was revived and further developed by Friar John Baptist of the Blessed Sacrament (Spanish: Juan Bautista del Santísimo Sacramento).

A small community of friars were allowed to open their own monastery under the leadership of Friar John Baptist in 1603. Adopting a simpler form of life and of their religious habit and wearing only sandals, they became known as the Mercedarian Recollects, later as Discalced Mercedarians. They were approved as a semi-autonomous branch of Order by Pope Gregory XV in 1621. They eventually separated and became a fully independent Order.

== The fourth vow ==
Some orders and congregations add particular vows, besides the three vows of religion. These additional vows are part of the nature of the profession of each order and are permitted by the church. They can be solemn or simple, perpetual or temporary. The Fourth Vow of the Order of Mercy is a Solemn Vow. In accordance with the general principle of a vow, it is an act of the will and an authentic promise, in which the reason for the vow is perfection. It also presupposes a sincere will of obligation in conscience and by virtue of the community.

=== Fourth vow in the various constitutions ===
- In the First Constitutions of the Order, the American Constitutions (1272): "... all the brothers of the Order must always be gladly disposed to give up their lives, if it is necessary, as Jesus Christ gave up His for us..."
- The Albertine Constitutions (1327): "Chapter 28: Surrender of one's life as hostage in Saracen Territory."
- The Zumelian Constitutions (1588): "I will be obedient to you and your successors up to death; and I will remain in person in the power of the Saracens if it be necessary for the Redemption of Christ's Faithful."
- The Madrilene Constitutions (1692) and the Roman Constitutions (1895): "Therefore, we must understand in the first place, that all our religious are committed to the Redemption of Captives in such a way that they must not only always be disposed to carry it out in fact if the Order sends them, but also to collect alms, or if the prelates do select them, to do whatever else may be necessary for the act of redemption to be carried out." (Note: Also in the Madrilene Constitutions: "We declare that this vow is essential because it inseparably constitutes our Order in its nature and substance by virtue of the early institution… and our predecessors have always professed and fulfilled it.")
- The Constitutions and Norms (1970): "The Mercedarian, urged by Charity, dedicated himself to God by a particular vow in virtue of which he promises to give his own life, if it will be necessary, as Christ did for us, to free from the new forms of slavery the Christians who are in danger of losing their Faith."
- The Aquarian Constitutions (1986): "In order to fulfill this mission we, impelled by love, consecrate ourselves to God with a special vow, by virtue of which we promise to give up our lives, as Christ gave his life for us, should it be necessary, in order to save those Christians who find themselves in extreme danger of losing their faith by new forms of captivity". (Note: Also formulated as: "To fulfill this mission, driven by charity, we consecrate ourselves to God with a special vow, called Redemption, by virtue of which we promise to give our lives, if necessary, as Christ gave his for us, to save Christians who are in extreme danger of losing their faith in new forms of slavery".)

== Present day ==
The Order of the Blessed Virgin Mary of Mercy, founded in 1218, is an international community of priests and brothers, who live a life of prayer and communal fraternity based on the Rule of Saint Augustine and the constitutions of the order.

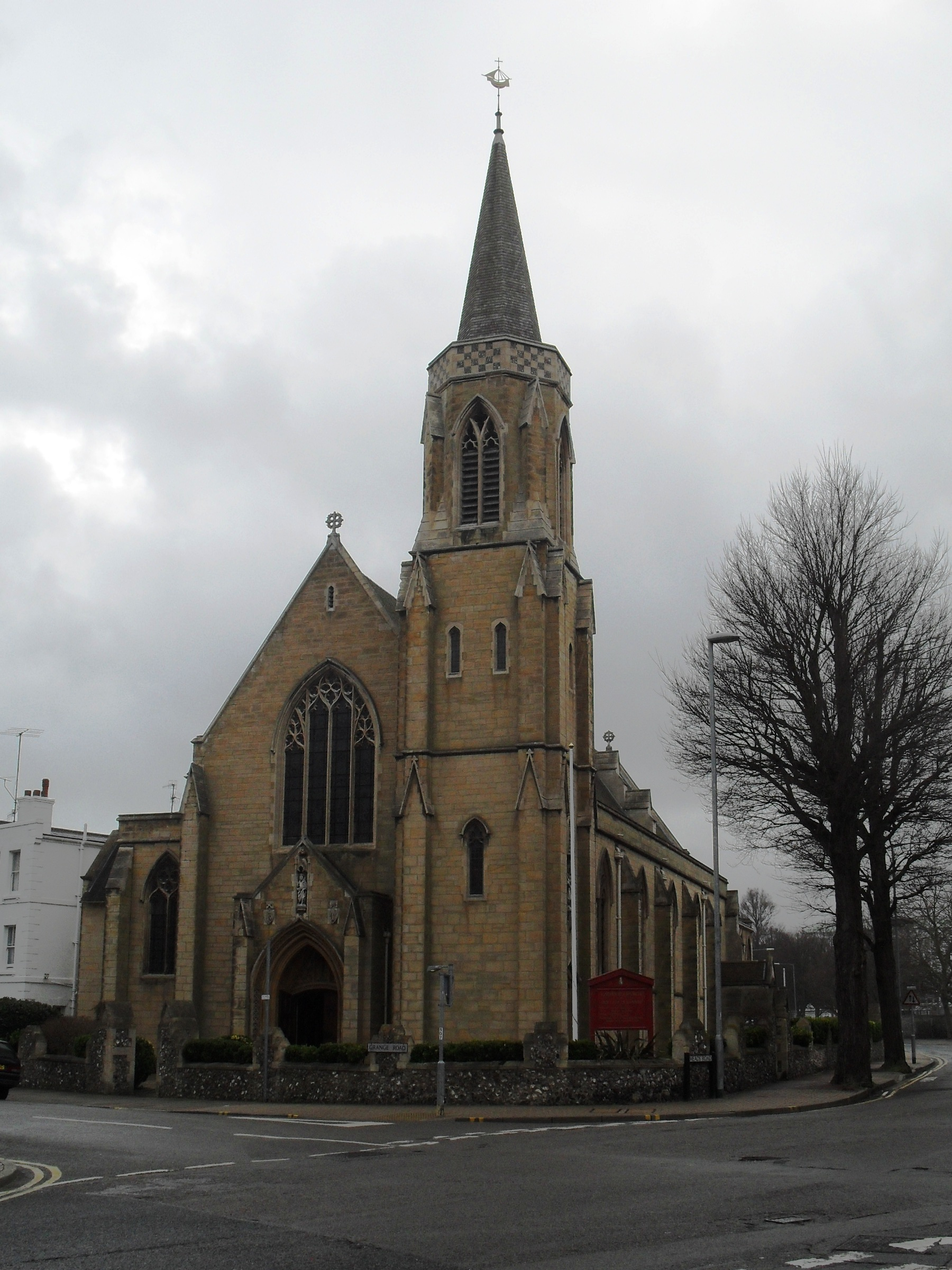
Church of Our Lady of Ransom, Eastbourne, East Sussex

== Our Lady of Ransom ==
Eventually a feast day was instituted and observed on September 24, first in the religious order, then in Spain and France, and on February 22, 1696 Pope Innocent XII extended it to the entire church. The Mercedarians keep this day as a first class feast, with a vigil, privileged Octave and Proper Office under the title: Solemnitas Descensionis B. Mariæ V. de Mercede.

=== Patronage ===
Our Lady of Ransom is the principal patron of Barcelona; the proper Office was extended to Barcelona (1868) and to all Spain (second class, 1883). Sicily took up the old date of the feast (Sunday nearest to August 1) by permission of the Roman Congregation of Rites of August 31, 1805.

In England, Our Lady of Ransom is also venerated as “Our Lady of the Dowry” in the context of a revival of devotion to her “to obtain the rescue of England as Our Lady's Dowry”, i.e., to reverse England's formal separation from the Roman Catholic Church and restore papal supremacy.

In the Philippines, the oldest known center of devotion to Our Lady of Mercy is in Bahay Pare, Candaba, Pampanga, whom they call "Nuestra" or "Apung de la Merced". Devotees flock to the parish to ask Mary to intercede for their spiritual, mental, and physical health, for their families and studies, and for the increase of vocations to the priesthood and consecrated life. In Mercedes, Catbalogan, Roman Catholics have been devoted to Nuestra Señora de las Mercedes as their principal patroness, often invoked for protection against Moro raiders.

== Saints, Blesseds, and other holy people ==
Saints

- Ramon Nonato (c. 1204 – 31 August 1240), priest, canonized on 13 August 1669
- Serapion of Algiers (1179 – 14 November 1240), protomartyr of the Order, canonized on 14 April 1728
- Pedro Nolasco (c. 1189 – 6 May 1256), founder of the order, canonized on 30 September 1628
- María de Cervellón (1 December 1230 - 19 September 1290), canonized on 15 February 1692
- Pedro Pascual (c. 1227 – 1299/1300), Bishop of Jaen, canonized on 4 June 1670

Blesseds

- Esclaramunda of Foix (c. 1250 – c. 1315), Queen consort of Majorca and protector of the order, declared Blessed by popular acclaim
- María Ana Navarro de Guevara Romero (Mariana of Jesus) (17 January 1565 - 17 April 1624), tertiary, beatified on 25 May 1783
- Juan Nepomuceno Zegrí Moreno (11 October 1831 - 17 March 1905), founder of the Mercedarian Sisters of Charity, beatified on 9 November 2003
- María Pilar López de Maturana Ortiz de Zárate (Margarita María) (25 July 1884 - 23 July 1934), founder of the Mercedarian Missionaries of Bérriz, beatified on 22 October 2006
- Mariano Alcalá Pérez and 18 Companions (died between July to November 1936), Martyrs of the Spanish Civil War from Aragon, beatified on 13 October 2013

Venerables

- Pedro de Urraca García of the Holy Trinity (c. 1583 - 7 August 1657), priest, declared Venerable on 31 January 1981
- Andrés Garrido Perales (29 November 1663 - 23 February 1728), priest, declared Venerable on 13 December 2021
- José León Torres (15 April 1849 - 15 December 1930), founder of the Mercedarian Tertiary Sisters of the Child Jesus, declared Venerable on 26 March 1994
- María del Refugio Aguilar Torres de Cancino (21 September 1866 - 24 April 1937), widow and founder of the Mercedarian Sisters of the Blessed Sacrament, declared Venerable on 16 July 2015
- Regina Lete Landa (Isabel of Jesus) (7 September 1913 - 13 October 1941), professed religious of the Mercedarian Sisters of Charity, declared Venerable on 26 June 2006

Servants of God

- Juan Gilabert Jofré (24 June 1350 - 18 May 1402), priest, declared Servant of God on 21 August 1995
- Juan González Alcázar (Juan Bautista of the Blessed Sacrament) (July 1554 - 5 October 1616), founder of the Discalced Mercedarians
- Gonçalo Días of Amarante (c. 1540 - 27 January 1618), priest
- Antonio of Saint Peter (c. 1570 - 30 July 1622), priest
- Francisco de Jesús Bolaños Rosero (4 October 1701 - 14 December 1785), priest, declared Servant of God on 11 October 1991
- Luisa de la Torre Rojas (21 June 1819 - 21 November 1869), Peruvian tertiary
- Antonino Pisano (19 March 1907 - 6 August 1927), cleric
- Manuel Cereijo Muiños and 16 Companions (died between July 1936 to July 1938), Martyrs of the Spanish Civil War from Castile
- Inocêncio López Santamaria (28 December 1874 - 9 March 1958), Bishop of São Raimundo Nonato, declared Servant of God in 2016
- Maria do Carmo [Carmita] Bartolomeu Simões (6 March 1959 - 3 February 1982), Angolan postulant of the Mercedarian Sisters of Charity and martyr

== See also ==
- Scapular of Our Lady of Ransom
- Our Lady of Mercy
- Trinitarian Order
- Santa Maria della Mercede e Sant'Adriano a Villa Albani, Rome
- Sisters of Charity of the Blessed Virgin Mary
- Francisco de Santiago y Calderón, O.M. (1669-1736), a bishop in Mexico
