= Peter Nolasco =

13th-century Spanish Catholic religious founder and saint (1189–1256)

Saint Peter Nolasco O. de M.
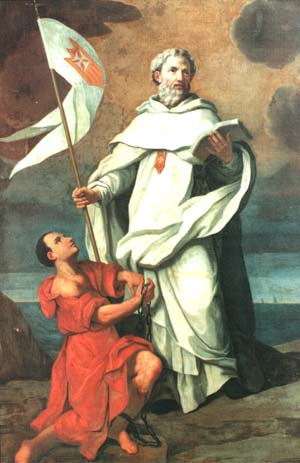
- Saint Peter Nolasco as found in the Generalate of the Mercedarian Order.

Confessor
- Born: 1189; Mas-des-Saintes-Puelles, Languedoc, Kingdom of France
- Died: 6 May 1256; Valencia, Kingdom of Valencia
- Venerated in: Roman Catholic Church
- Canonized: 30 September 1628, Saint Peter's Basilica, Rome, Papal States by Pope Urban VIII
- Feast: 6 May

Peter Nolasco, O. de M. (Pere Nolasc in Catalan, Pierre Nolasque in French and Pedro Nolasco in Spanish; 1189 – 6 May 1256) was a Catholic nobleman known for founding the Royal and Military Order of Our Lady of Mercy of the Redemption of the Captives (the Mercedarians) with approval by Pope Gregory IX on 17 January 1235.

Though there is debate about whether Nolasco was born in France or Spain, it is clear that he was in Barcelona when he was a teenager and became part of an army fighting the Moors in the Iberian Peninsula and was appointed tutor to the young king, James I of Aragon.

== Background ==
Between the eighth and the fifteenth centuries, medieval Europe was in a state of intermittent warfare between the Christian kingdoms of southern Europe and the Muslim polities of North Africa, Southern France, Sicily and portions of Spain. According to James William Brodman, the threat of capture, whether by pirates or coastal raiders or during one of the region's intermittent wars, was a continuous threat to residents of Catalonia, Languedoc and the other coastal provinces of medieval Christian Europe. Raids by militias, bands, and armies from both sides was an almost annual occurrence.

Alfonso VIII's incursions into Andalusia in 1182 are said to have brought him over 2,000 captives and thousands in ransom, while in 1191 the governor of Córdoba, took 3,000 prisoners and 15,000 head of cattle in an attack on Silves. For over six hundred years, these constant armed confrontations produced numerous war prisoners on both sides. Any Christian or Muslim near the ever-shifting territorial borders was in danger of capture. Captives were considered war booty. Those not ransomed were sold as slaves. In the lands of Visigothic Spain, both Christian and Islamic societies had become accustomed to the buying and selling of captives. In the thirteenth century, in addition to spices, slaves constituted one of the goods of the flourishing trade between Christian and Moslem ports.

== Life ==
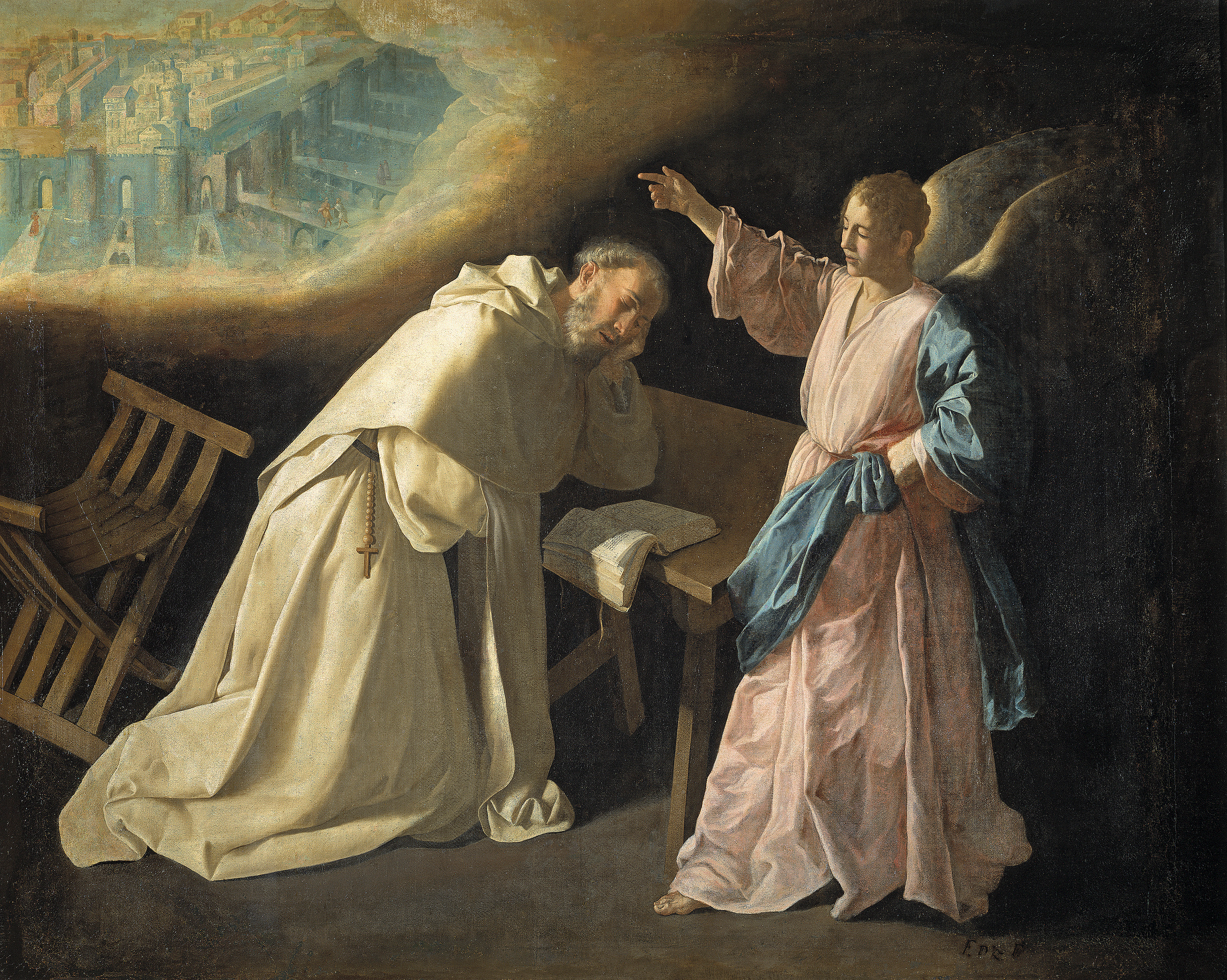
San Pedro Nolasco has a vision of Jerusalem.

Sources for the origins of the Mercedarians are scant, and almost nothing is known of their founder, Peter Nolasco. A narrative developed between the fifteenth and early seventeenth centuries that culminated in Nolasco's canonization as a saint in 1628. The two earliest accounts, those written by the mid-fifteenth-century Mercedarian chroniclers Nadal Gaver and Pedro Cijar, declare the founder, the son of a merchant, to be from the French village of Mas-Saintes-Puelles, near the town of Castelnaudary, in the modern department of Aude. A fuller account of his life by Francisco Zumel appeared in 1588 and is the basis for the biography given in the Acta sanctorum.

According to Butler, Nolasco followed Simon de Montfort in the war against the Albigensians. In the Battle of Muret, Montfort had defeated and killed King Peter II of Aragon; taken his son James, a child of six years, prisoner; and sent him back to Aragon with Nolasco, who was twenty-five years old, being appointed his tutor.

After making a pilgrimage to Our Lady of Montserrat, Nolasco went to Barcelona, where he began to practice various works of charity. Nolasco became concerned with the plight of Christians captured in Moorish raids and decided to establish a religious order to succor these unfortunates.

== Ransomer ==
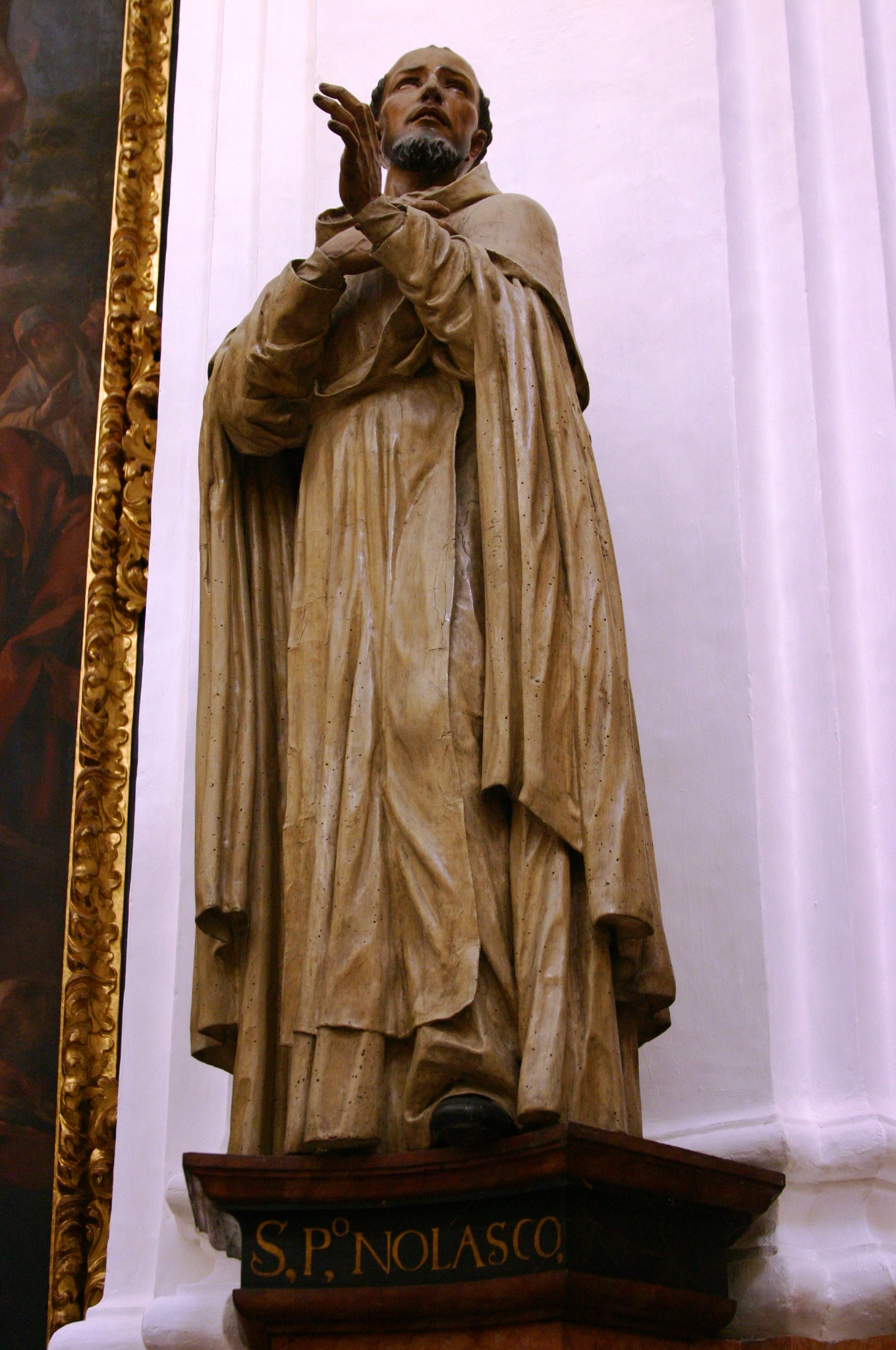
St. Pedro Nolasco – Capilla de Santa Teresa – La Catedral – Córdoba

Nolasco began ransoming Christian captives in 1203. In 1218, Raymond of Penyafort started a lay confraternity for ransoming slaves from the Moors and Peter became the procurator for this. Peter's plan, was to establish a well-structured and stable redemptive religious order under the patronage of Mary.

In 1230, Nolasco became the first Superior and also held the position of Ransomer, the order being concerned with the freeing of Christian prisoners from the Moors. He worked first in the Kingdom of Valencia and then in Granada. He made several other journeys to the coasts of Spain, besides a voyage to Algiers. Raymond Nonnatus later succeeded to this position.

The order originally attracted young noblemen, whose heritage equipped them to address the matter of ransom practically , and friars who were in holy orders and attended the choir. The knights were to guard the coasts against the Saracens but were obliged to choir when not on duty. Nolasco himself was never ordained priest, and the first seven generals or commanders were chosen out of the knights though the friars were always more numerous. The founder required of himself and his followers a special vow in addition to the usual three, to devote their "whole substance and very liberty to the ransoming of slaves", even to the point of acting as hostages in order to free others. According to records, the Order of the Blessed Virgin Mary for the Ransom of Captives accomplished approximately 70,000 rescues-some 2,700 during the founder's lifetime.

The order elected a habit of white, signifying innocence. Some histories claim that Mary provided such guidance during her appearance to Nolasco. An enthusiastic King James authorized the members to wear on their and long scapulars his own distinguished arms of Aragon.

Nolasco died in 1256 in Barcelona, seven years after having resigned as Superior. According to tradition he died on 25 December, but recent studies of the Royal Archives of Barcelona have indicated that he died on 6 May.

== Veneration ==
Nolasco was canonized by Pope Urban VIII. His festival was appointed by Pope Clement VIII to be kept on January 31, which was later moved to 28 January, when the former date was assigned to the liturgical celebration of John Bosco (see General Roman Calendar as in 1954). He is presently inscribed in the Roman Martyrology, the official list of saints, on 6 May, the day of his death.

== Legacy ==
The order spread throughout most of Spain and was closely associated with the "Reconquista" of the southern provinces under Ferdinand and Isabella. The order flourished in France, England, Germany, Portugal, and Spain. From Spain, it provided a missionary presence in the New World.
