= Iglesia de La Merced, Antigua Guatemala =

Convent of the Mercedarians
- Iglesia y convento de Nuestra Señora de Las Mercedes; Convento e Iglesia de La Merced (Spanish)
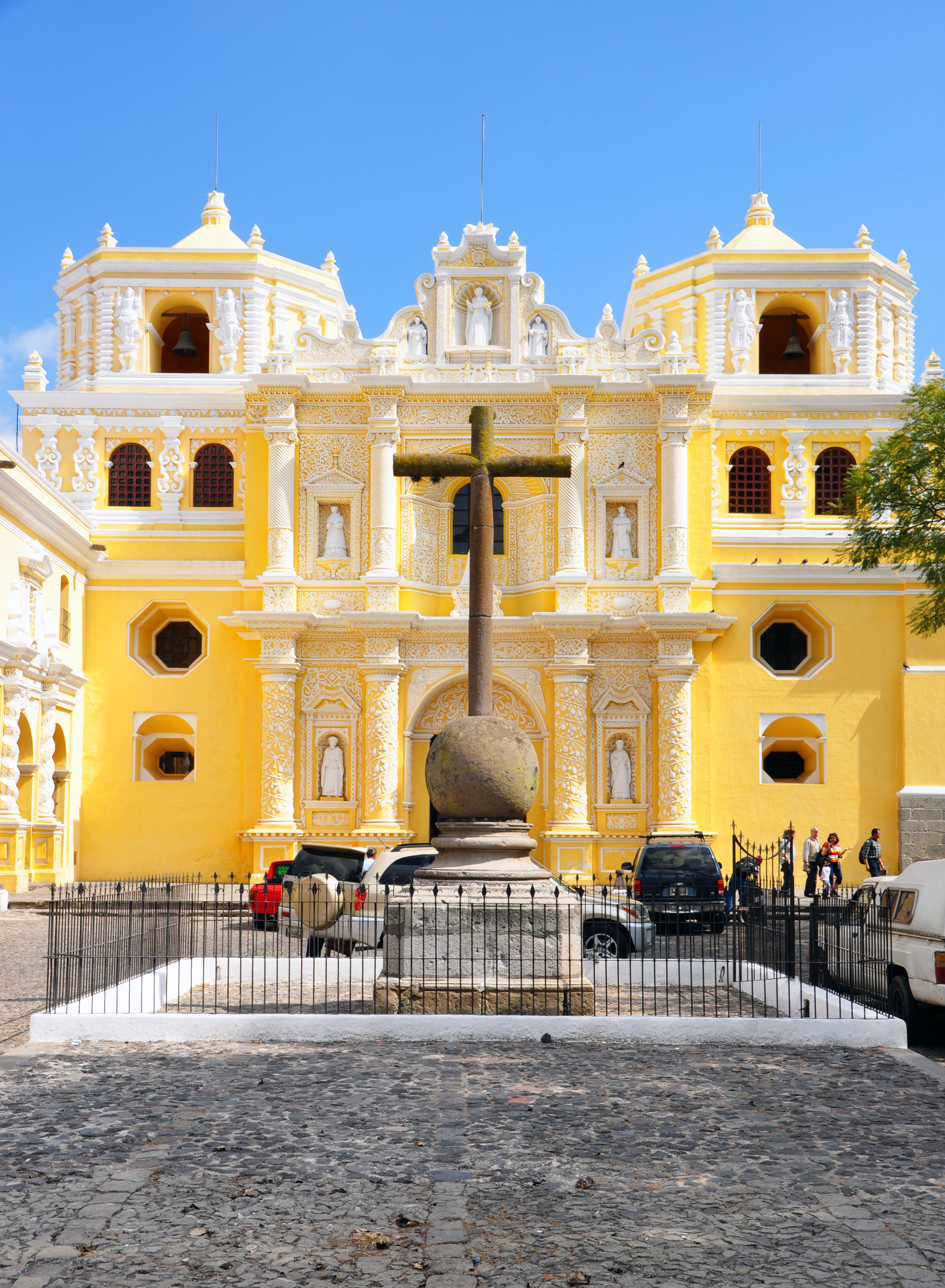
- Main facade

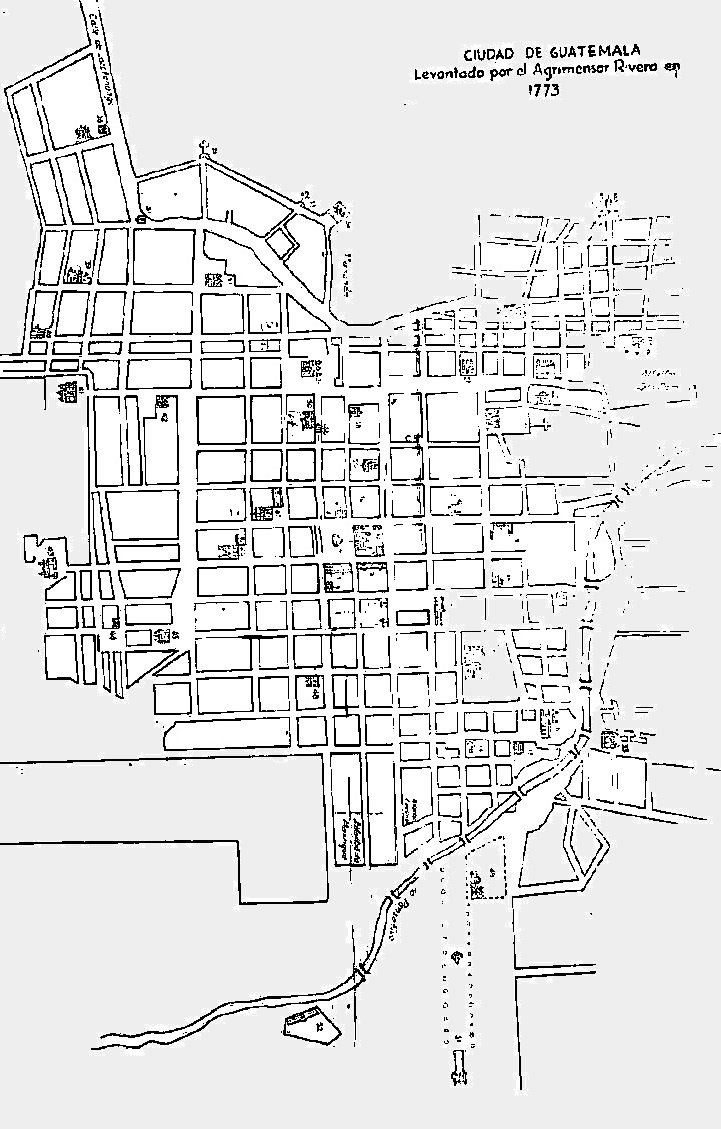
- Location within Antigua Guatemala

General information
- Status: Active church
- Architectural style: Spanish seismic baroque
- Location: Antigua Guatemala, Guatemala
- Coordinates: 14°33′42.016″N 90°44′3.649″W
- Construction started: 1751
- Completed: 1767
- Owner: Secular clergy

Design and construction
- Architect: Juan de Dios Estrada

The Church and Convent of La Merced is a Catholic church located in the city of Antigua Guatemala in Guatemala. The architect Juan de Dios Estrada was in charge of its construction from 1749. The church was dedicated in 1767.

== Description ==
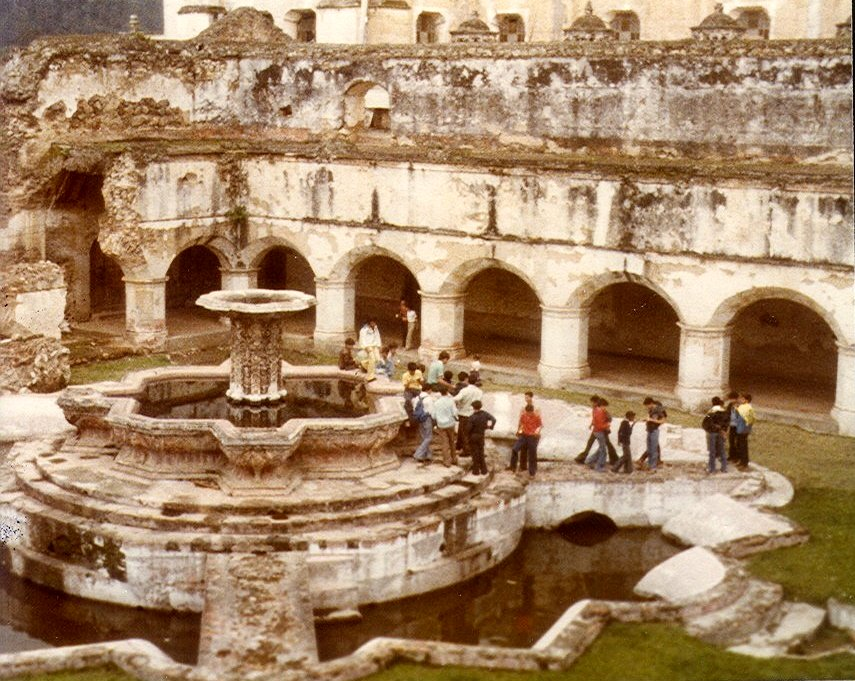
Fountain of los Pescados in 1979.

In Guatemalan Churrigueresque style, this church has two bell-towers. On the façade of the church, in its upper part, there is a sculpture of St. Peter Nolasco, founder of the Mercedarian Order. Below appears Virgin of Mercy and the Mercedarian shield. The stucco and brick sculptures of St. Raymond Nonnatus and St. Pedro Armengol are found on the left side of the façade. St. Peter Pascual and St. Mary de Cervellione, the first Mercedarian nun, are on the right side.

The “Fountain of los Pescados”, dates from the 18th century; At twenty-seven meters in diameter, it is one of the largest colonial fountains in Latin America. The fountain is shaped like a water lily, a very common flower in the Guatemalan lowlands, especially in lakes and lagoons. In the symbolism of the ancient Mayan peoples, it is associated with creation: a god created a water lily from which the rest of the gods came.

== History ==
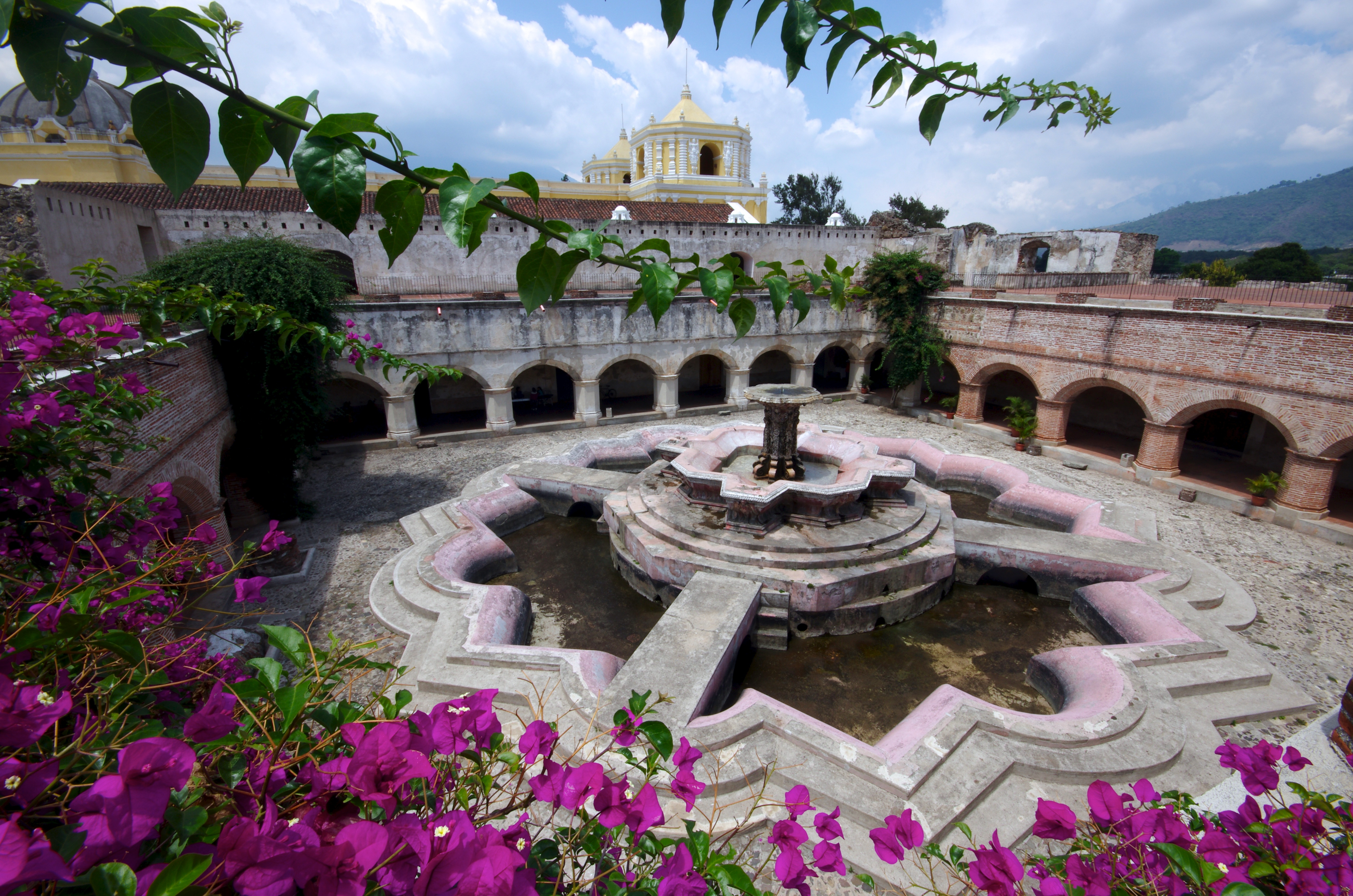
:"Fountain of los Pescados" of the Mercedarian convent in 2011.

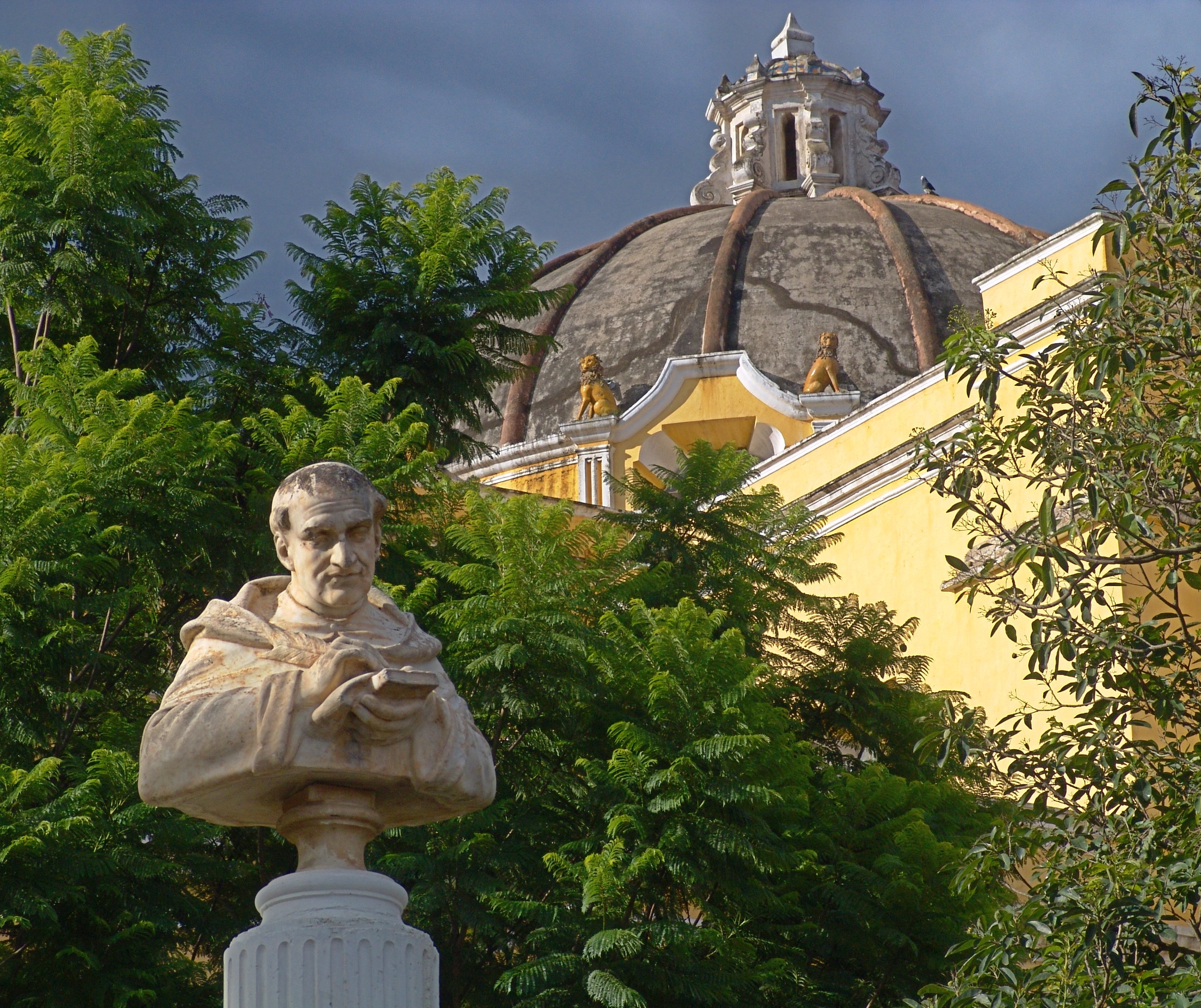
Dome

Coat of arms of the Order of Mercy.

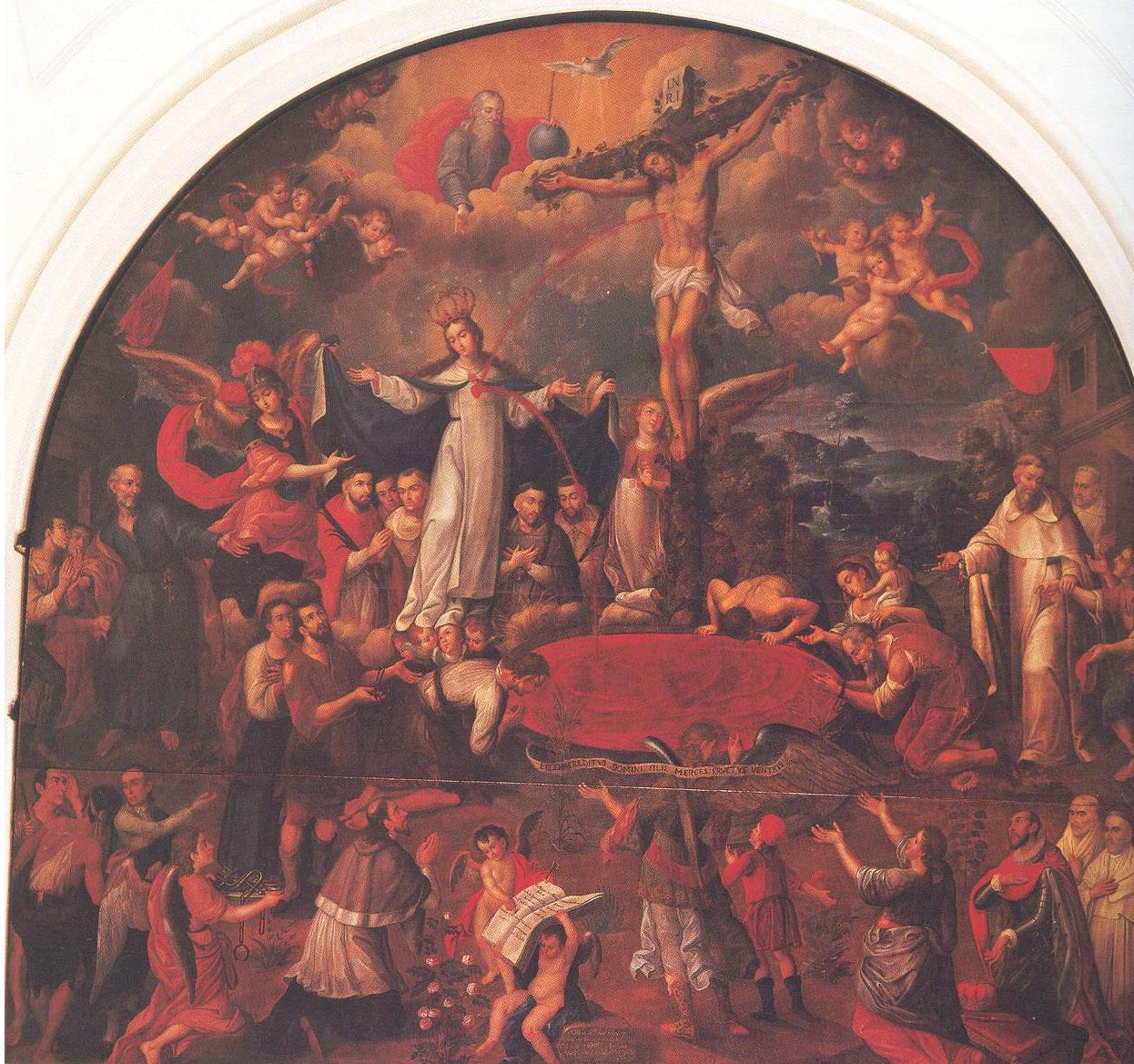
Large painting "Apotheosis of the Order of Mercy" by José de Valladares (1710–1775) and Juan José Rosales (1751–1816) inside The Church of La Merced.

Friar Marcos Dardón arrived in Central America with the Spanish conquistadors and actively participated in the future province of The Mercy of Guatemala, created shortly after his death. The bishop of the diocese, Francisco Marroquín, brought it with him to Guatemala around 1537. The Mercedarians settled in the Almolonga Valley and five years later, after the landslide of the Volcán de Agua Volcano, they moved to the Panchoy Valley. At that time, Friar Marcos was in the province of Chiapas, holding the position of protector of the Indians. And some time later, in 1546, he went to Guatemala, where he successively held the positions of commander of the convent of the city and provincial vicar.

Bishop Francisco Marroquín stated that the Mercedarians were the first to settle and persevere in Guatemala City. But their field of apostolate was extended outside the city itself, through the lands that in the present make up the Guatemalan departments of Quetzaltenango, San Marcos and Huehuetenango, where they had a large number of doctrines, which multiplied more during the last years of the 16th century or early 18th century.

Around 1550, at the request of the lawyer López Cerrato, president of the Audiencia, Friar Marcos promoted the foundation of the houses of Gracia de Dios, Tencoa and Valladolid of Comayagua; the three in the Honduran region, so that their religious were in charge of the doctrine of the natives. The first two were founded by Friar Nicolás del Valle, who in 1565 presented a memorial to the Council of the Indies, requesting help for the three convents, where the Mercedarians, "who preach the holy gospel", have not enjoyed royal protection.

With nuclei of convents, in 1561 the province of Our Lady of the Mercy of Guatemala was founded, which included, in addition to Guatemala and Honduras, the regions of San Salvador, Nicaragua, Costa Rica and, for some years, until it was erected in independent province, also the region of Mexico.

In 1565 the Mercedarian province of the Presentation of Guatemala was created. During the first part of the 17th century they were in charge of the evangelization of some towns around the city of Santiago, which over time became part of the city. The Mercedarians owned the "La Vega" sugar mill and the "Nuestra Señora del Buen Suceso de Pechar" sugar mill; they also built the San Gerónimo School, but it was confiscated in 1763 for not having a royal license and was used as the Royal Customs.

In 1761, the new captain general, Alonso Fernández de Heredia, who was field marshal of the royal armies and had already been governor of Nicaragua, Comayagua, Florida and Yucatán, arrived in Santiago de los Caballeros de Guatemala; the new ruler donated four thousand pesos for the construction of the Iglesia de la Merced. The church was dedicated in 1767, just six years before the Santa Marta Earthquakes, which it resisted thanks to the new construction techniques used. On the façade of the church, in its upper part, there is a sculpture of St. Peter Nolasco, founder of the Mercedarian Order. Below appears Virgin of Mercy and the Mercedarian shield. The stucco and brick sculptures of the Mercedarian saints San Ramón Nonato and San Pedro Armengol are found on the left side of the façade. St. Peter Pascual and St. Mary de Cervellione, the first Mercedarian nun, are on the right side.

=== Bourbon reforms ===
In 1754, by virtue of a Royal Decree part of the Bourbon Reforms, all the parishes of the regular orders were transferred to the secular clergy.

In 1765 the Bourbon reforms of the Spanish Crown were published, which sought to recover the royal power over the colonies and increase tax collection. With these reforms, estancos were created to control the production of intoxicating beverages, tobacco, the gunpowder, the cards and the patio de roosters. The royal hacienda auctioned the estanco annually and an individual bought it, thus becoming the owner of the monopoly of a certain product. That same year four sub-delegations of the Royal Treasury were created in San Salvador, Ciudad Real, Comayagua and León and the administrative political structure of the Kingdom of Guatemala changed to fifteen provinces.

In addition to this administrative redistribution, the Spanish crown established a policy aimed at reducing the power of the Catholic Church, which until then was practically absolute over the Spanish vassals. The church's diminution policy was based on the Enlightenment and had six main points:

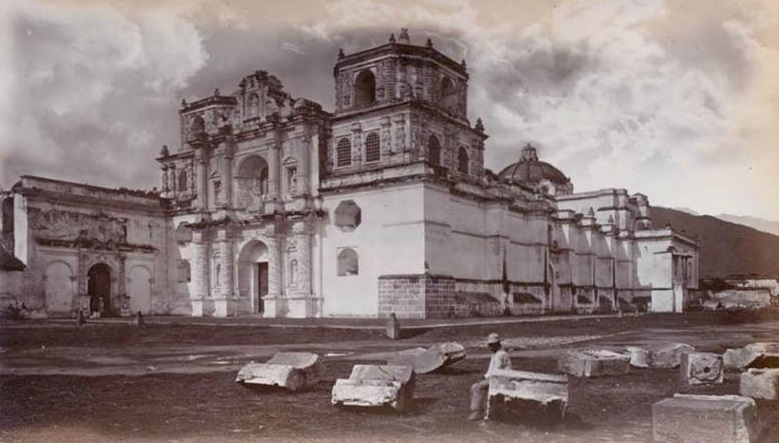
Image of La Merced in 1875. The church is in good condition, after having withstood the earthquakes of 1773. Photograph by Eadweard Muybridge.

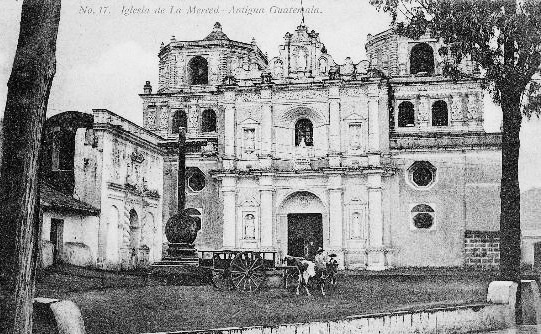
Iglesia de La Merced in 1910.

1. Decline of the Jesuit cultural legacy
2. Trend towards a lay and secularized culture
3. Decidedly rationalist attitude, of Cartesian heritage
4. Evaluation of natural science over religious dogma
5. A critique of the role of the Church within society and its derived organizations, especially the brotherhoods.
6. Promotion of regalism.

=== Santa Marta earthquakes ===
In 1773, the city of Santiago de los Caballeros de Guatemala was destroyed by the 1773 Guatemala earthquake ("Santa Marta earthquakes"); but as the Iglesia de Nuestra Señora de las Mercedes -or "Oratorio de la Merced", as it was known in the 19th century- was not it suffered major damage because it was practically new, it was still open for worship, conserving its images and altarpieces.

One of the measures taken by the president of the Audiencia, Martín de Mayorga, to force the transfer of the city and weaken the ecclesiastical power was the sending of the most important sculpture in the city. For this reason, in 1778 he ordered the transfer of the Jesús Nazareno de la Merced, along with the image of the Virgin, to force the Mercedarians to move. The transfer was painful, because the indigenous people in charge of the work took a long time to pick it up and the Antiguan parishioners prayed and wept for the loss of the image while they waited. When Jesús de la Merced left in a box, the people accompanied him to the Ánimas sentry box on the outskirts of the city; a devotee carried the cross of the image to San Lucas, a town that is fifteen kilometers from the Mercedarian convent in Antigua Guatemala.25 After stopping in San Lucas Sacatepéquez and Mixco, the images finally arrived in Nueva Guatemala de la Asunción by night, and the Christ was received by the Franciscan friars and then by the Mercedarians, to be deposited in a wooden frame on the land where the Mercedarian church of the new city was to be built. Martín de Mayorga came to see the image, thus concluding the most difficult episode of the transfer of the city. In 1801, the confraternity of Jesús Nazareno de la Merced moved the altarpiece of the image to the new city, although the church had not yet been built. Until 1813, when the Mercedarian church was inaugurated in the new city, the rest of the altarpieces were sent to Nueva Guatemala, but the old church continued to function as a parish.

Meanwhile, the city of Santiago began to be called the "ruined Guatemala", "Santiago de Guatemala antiguo" and the "old city". It was abandoned by all the royal and municipal authorities, and in 1784 by the last two parishes: Candelaria and Nuestra Señora de los Remedios, also remaining without ecclesiastical authorities. A few years later, Archbishop Cayetano Francos y Monroy authorized the operation of three parishes interim that bore the name of their predecessors: "San Sebastián", "Candelaria" and "Los Remedios", where the largest number of religious art works that remained in Antigua Guatemala was kept. After the independence of 1821, it recovered the category of city and was named as the head of the department of Sacatepéquez. Late in the 19th century, the parish of San Sebastián had to be transferred to the Mercedarian church, where it has been ever since.

=== Transfer of the image of Jesús Nazareno to Nueva Guatemala ===
==== Transfer ====
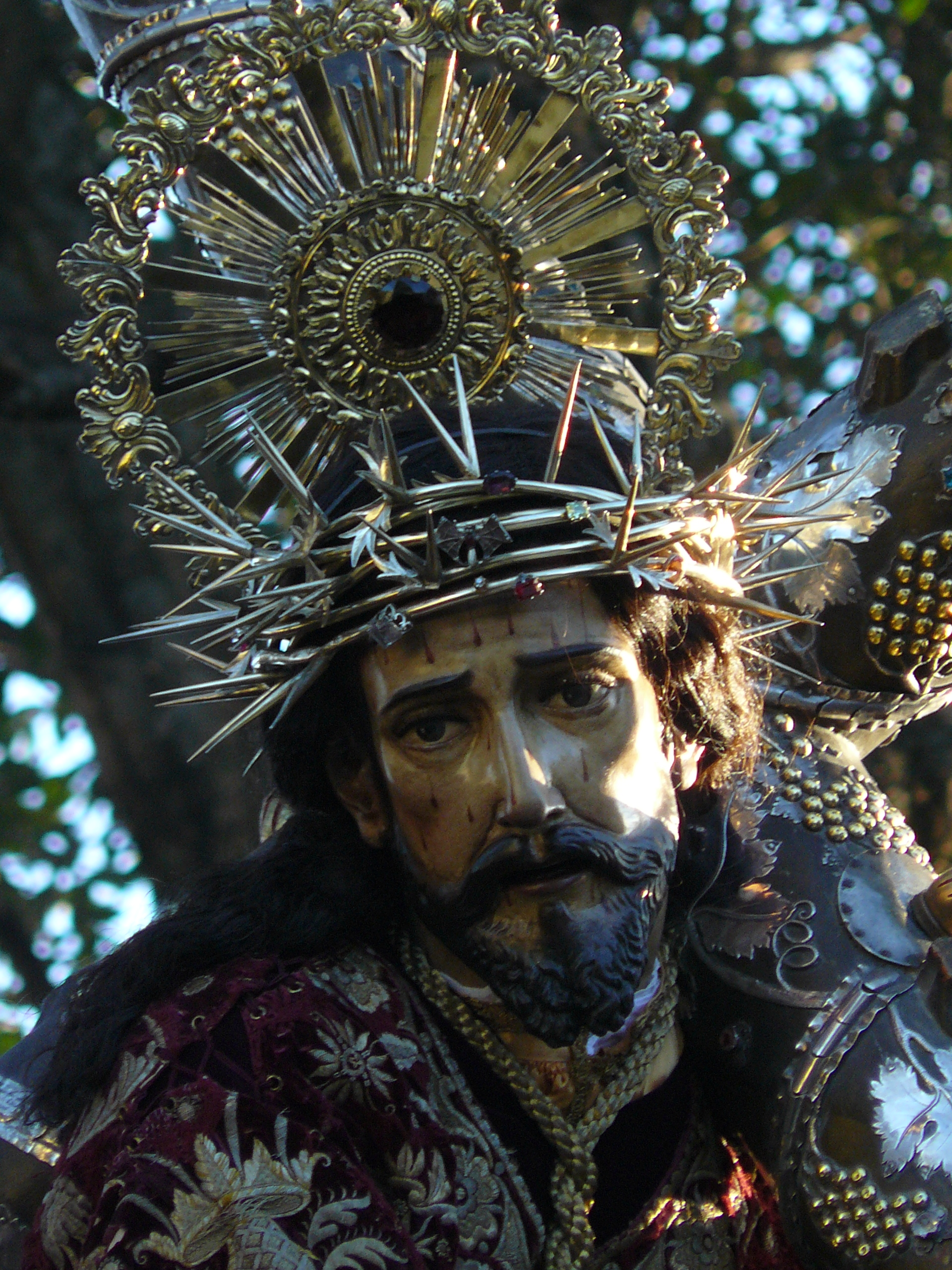
This is the first Jesús Nazareno of la Merced. Due to his enormous following the Spanish authorities forced La Merced friars to move it to the new capital in 1778.

In 1776, the capital was transferred to the city of Nueva Guatemala de la Asunción after the Santa Marta earthquakes of 1773 ruined the city of Santiago de los Caballeros de Guatemala for the third time in the same century and the civil authorities used that as an excuse to weaken the ecclesiastical authorities —following the recommendations of the Bourbon reforms undertaken by the Spanish crown in the second half of the 18th century— forcing the regular orders to move from their majestic convents to fragile temporary structures in the new city.

=== The second Jesús Nazareno de la Merced from Antigua Guatemala ===
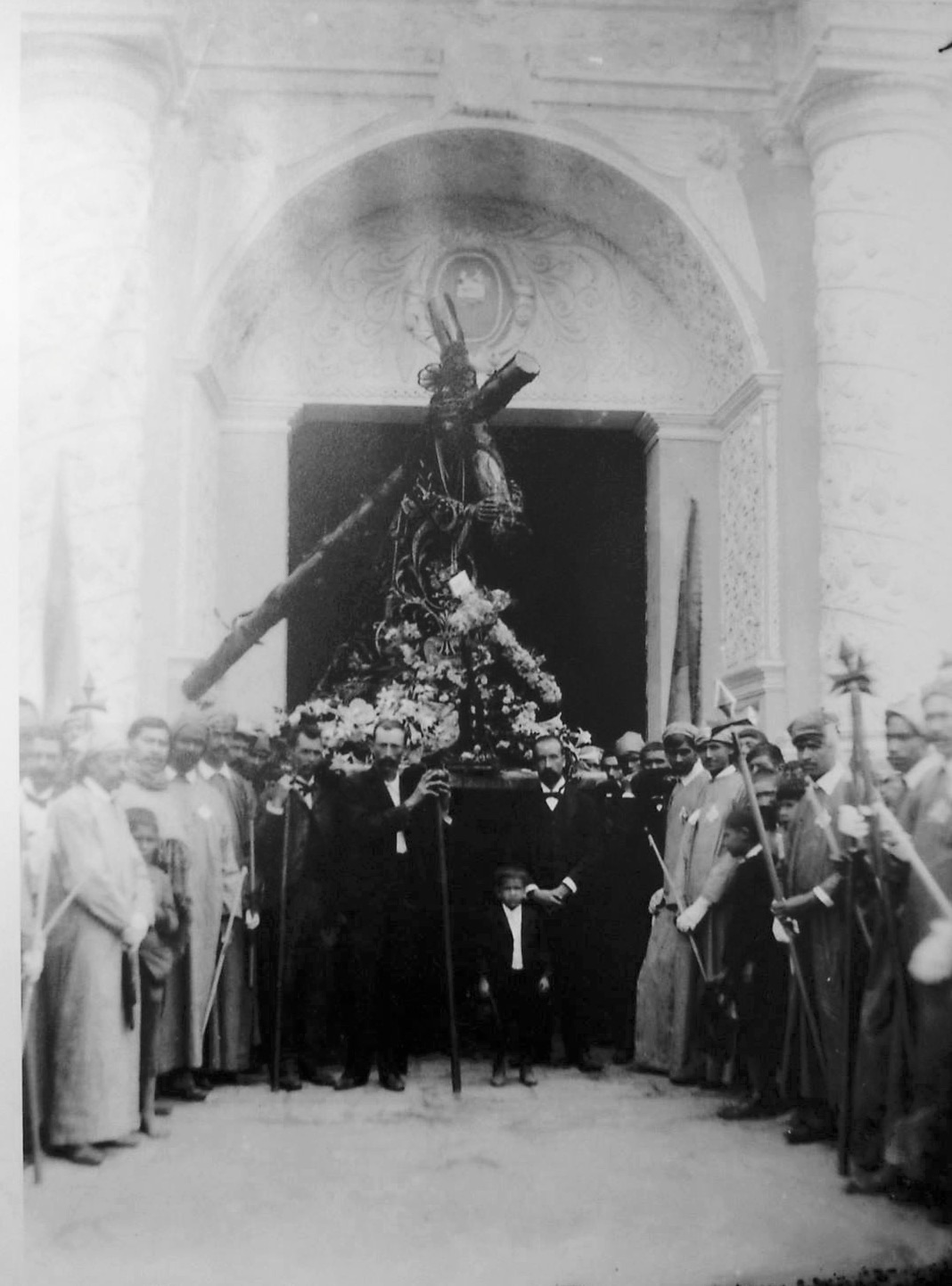
Procession of the second Jesús Nazareno de la Merced in 1934.

After the forced transfer of the Mercedarian Jesus Nazareno in 1778 to Nueva Guatemala de la Asunción (Guatemala City) so that the residents of that neighborhood would move to the new capital along with their venerated image, the church of La Merced did not have a Nazarene image; On the other hand, to avoid a repetition of the violent riots in the new city, the authorities decided to leave the image of Jesús Nazareno from the hermitage of San Jerónimo, in the Mulato neighborhood of Antigua Guatemala. This image was transferred to the parish of San Sebastián in 1804 and then, definitively, to the Iglesia de la Merced, where it has been since then and where it has become the most symbolic of Holy Week in Antigua Guatemala. Formerly it was believed that the image of Jesús Nazareno was originally from the Ermita de la Santa Cruz, but modern investigations showed that it came from the Ermita de San Jerónimo.

== Tourism ==
=== Brother Pedro Route ===
"Visiting the places where Saint Brother Pedro walked and knowing his legacy such as social works, is part of the learning of the pilgrimage. The “Pilgrim Route” allows one to experience a different way of getting to know Antigua Guatemala”.

The Church of Nuestra Señora de las Mercedes is one of the stages of the Brother Pedro Commemorative Tourist Route, which allows a tour of the sights of La Antigua Guatemala through the life and work of Brother Pedro.35

This route includes -among others- visits to Pedro Armengol's looms, the monument to Brother Pedro and the Arch del Matasanos, the Hospital Real de Santiago, tomb of Brother Pedro in the Church of San Francisco and the Convent of la Compañía de Jesus.

== Holy Week ==
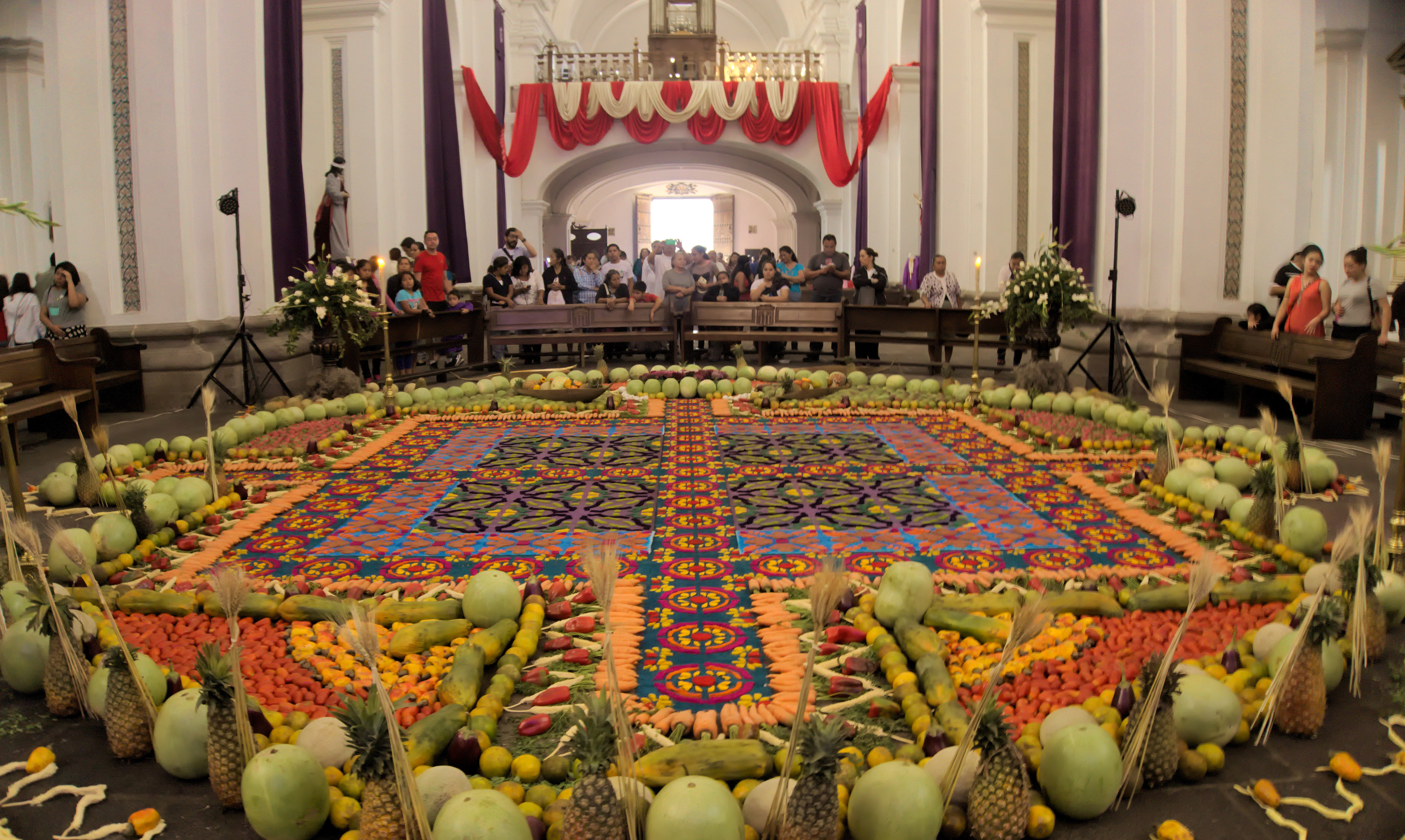
Carpet made of colorized sawdust and decorated with fruits and vegetables in La Merced Church during Holy Week 2016

Holy Week processions in Guatemala are one of the top tourist attractions in Antigua Guatemala. From La Merced, two iconic processions make their way through the streets during Holy Week: The Holy Week processions are one of the main tourist attractions in Guatemala. They are traditions that have remained intact through many centuries from very early times and they were made with images that are currently in Guatemala City, the current capital of the country since 1776. List of the processions that leave some churches of the city and surrounding towns:

Day	Image	Schedule
Palm Sunday	Jesús Nazareno de la Merced in His Review Procession	08:30 a. m. – 11:00 p. m.
Holy Thursday	Jesús Nazareno del Perdón of the Iglesia de San Francisco, Antigua Guatemala	12:00 p. m. – 11:00 p. m.
Holy Thursday	Jesús Nazareno de la Humildad of the Church San Cristóbal el Bajo	11:00 a. m. – 11:00 p. m.
Holy Friday	Jesús Nazareno de la Merced in its Procession of Penance	4:00 a. m. – 3:00 p. m.
Holy Friday	Holy Burial with the C.I of the Buried Lord and Holy Mary of Solitude of the Church School de Cristo	4:00 p. m. – 2:00 a. m.
Holy Friday	Procession of the Buried Lord of the Church of San Felipe de Jesús.	3:00 p. m. – 6:00 a. m.

== Image gallery ==
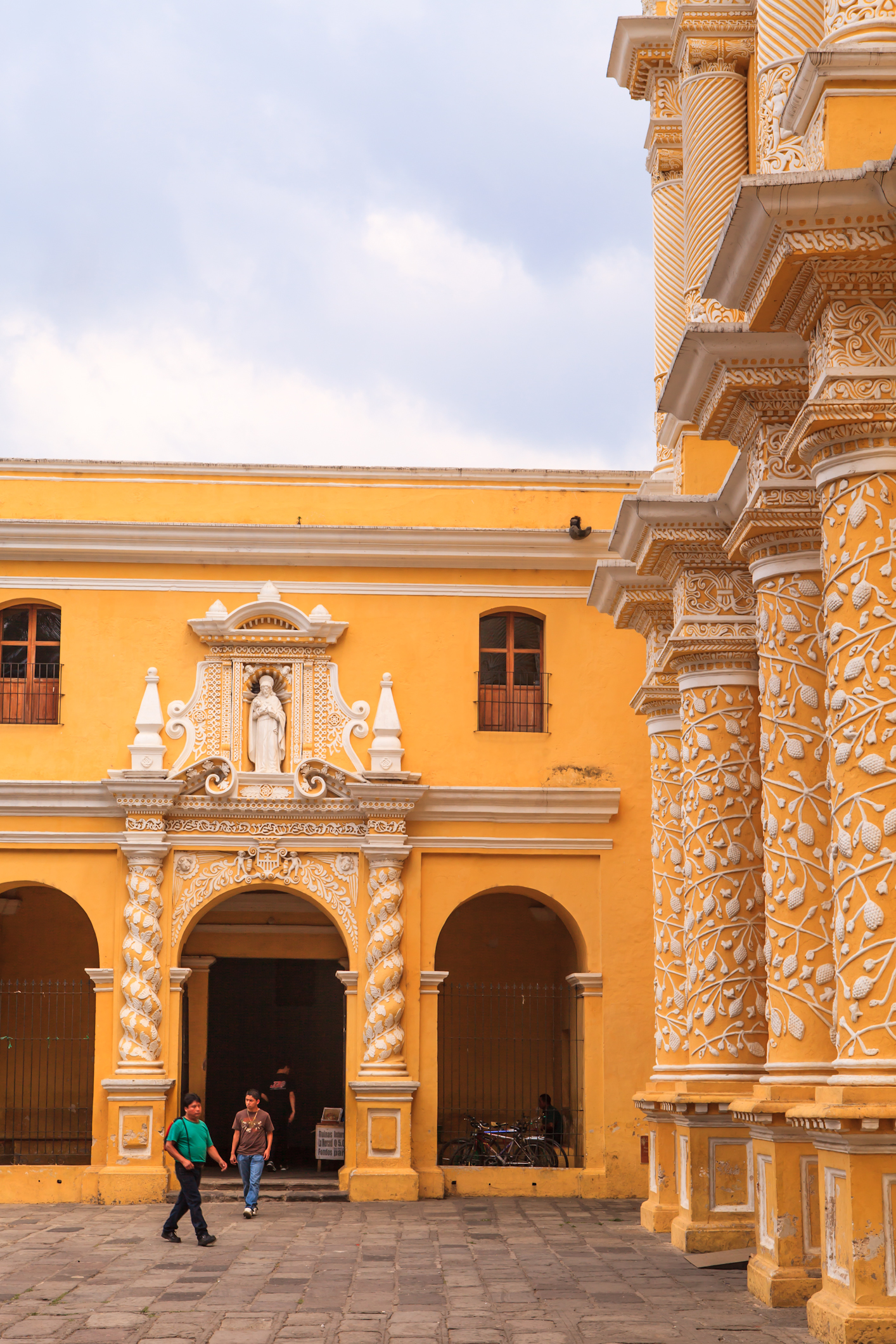
The convent of the church

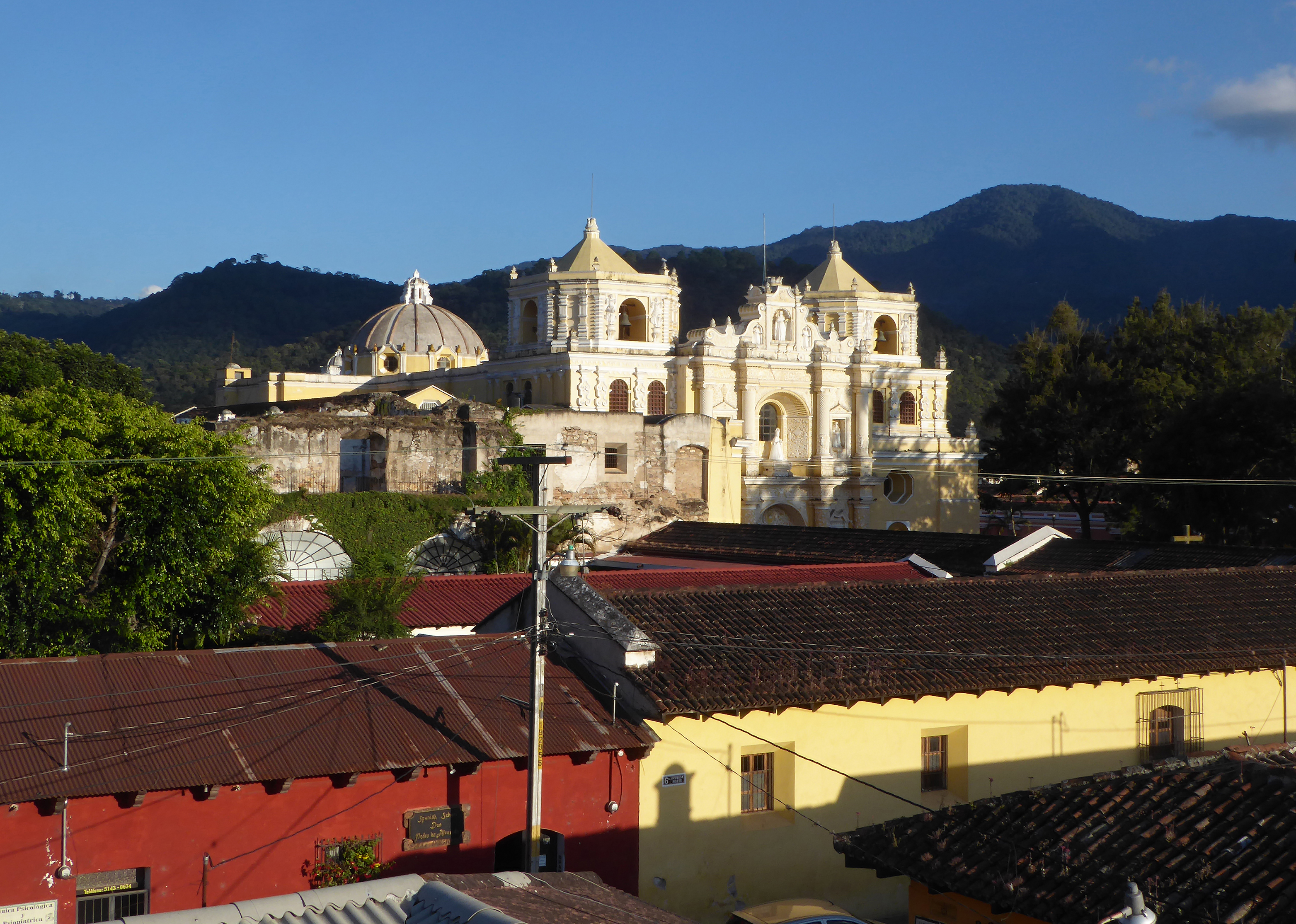
Far view

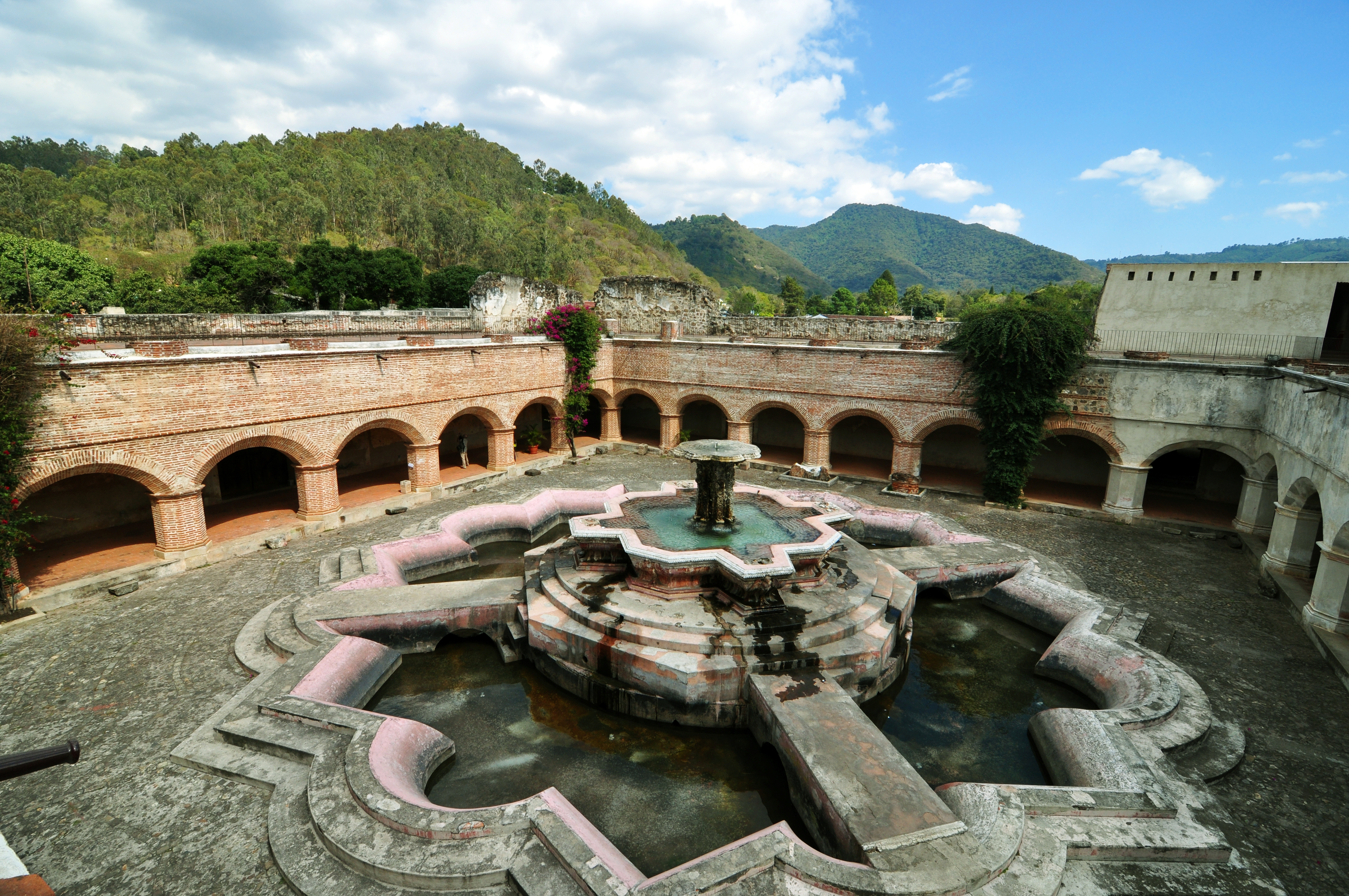

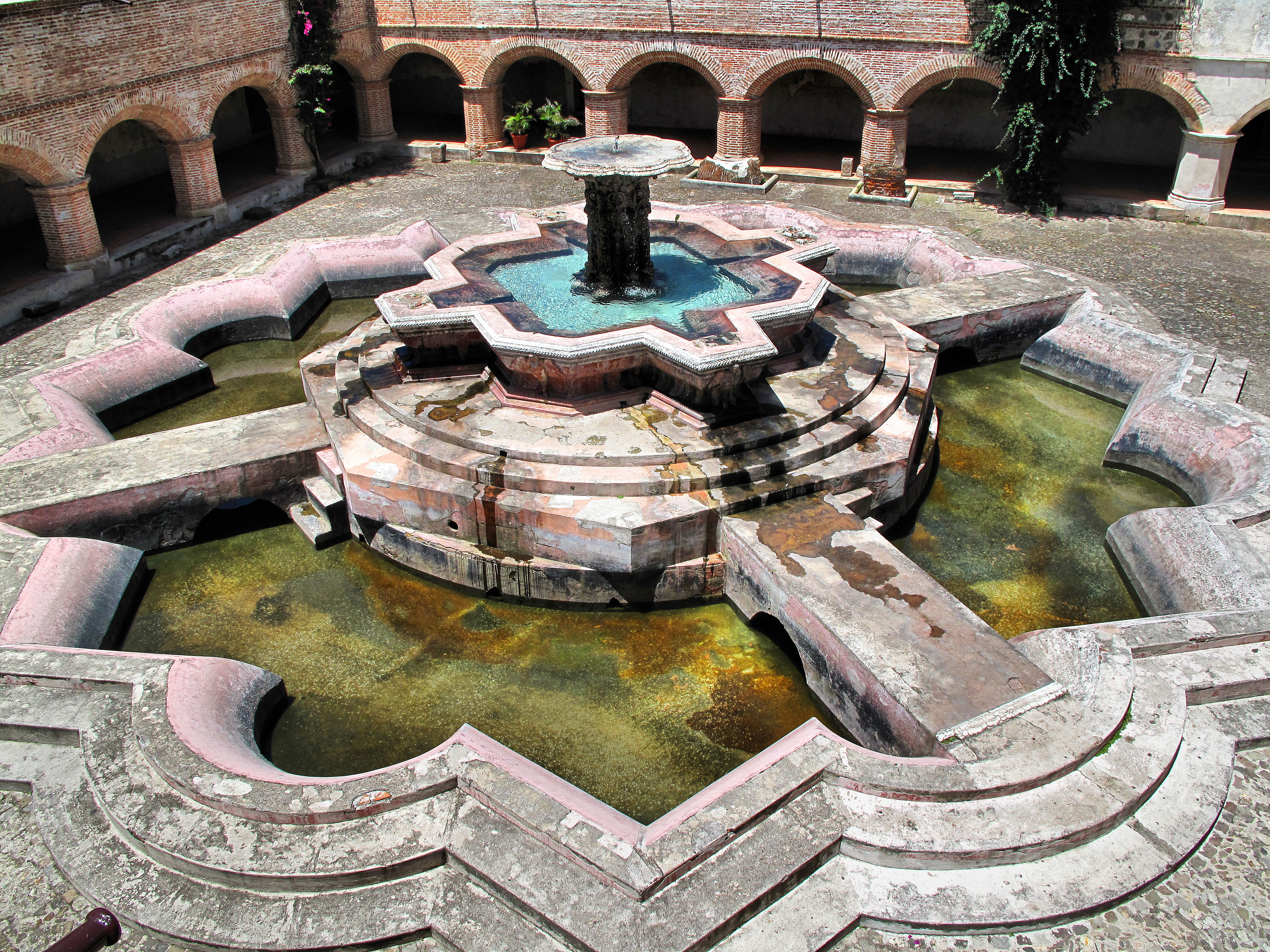

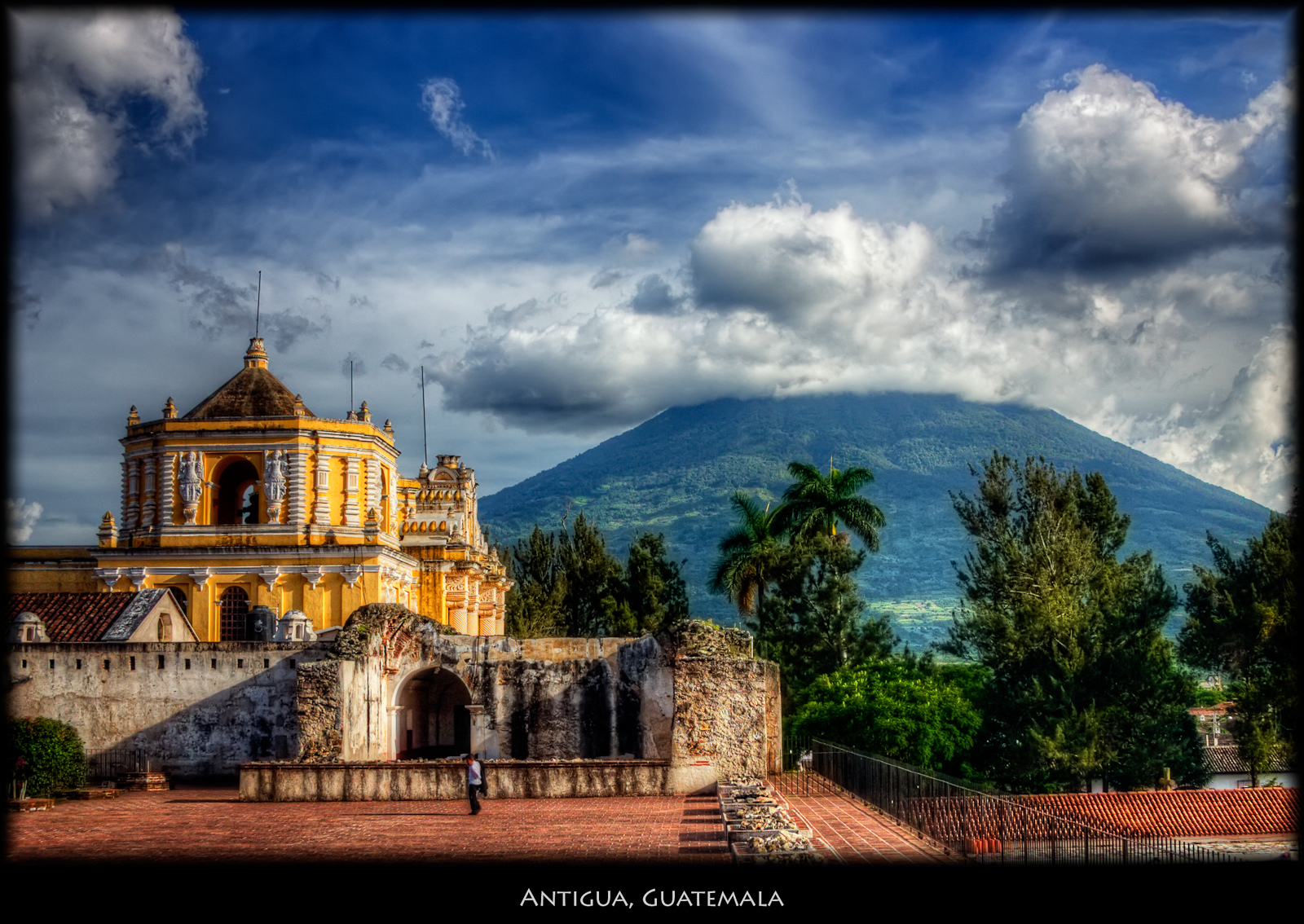
Volcán de Agua Volcano and La Merced church

== See also ==
- Antigua Guatemala

== Notes and references ==
=== Bibliography ===
- ACAN-EFE. "Lanzarán en Guatemala ruta en memoria del Santo Hermano Pedro". Prensa Libre (in Spanish). Archived from the original on 28 November 2014.
- Castro Seoane, José (1944). "La expansión de la Merced en la América colonial". Missionalia hispánica (in Spanish).
- EFE Verde. "El Gobierno guatemalteco anunció hoy que lanzará una ruta turística conmemorativa de la canonización del Santo Hermano Pedro de San José de Betancur, celebrada el 30 de julio de 2002 en Guatemala por el papa Juan Pablo II". La Información (in Spanish). Archived from the original on 29 November 2014.
- La Merced (2013). "La Merced, Antigua Guatemala". La Merced de Antigua (in Spanish). Guatemala. Archived from the original on 5 September 2013.
- Melchor Toledo, Johann Estuardo (2011). El arte religioso de la Antigua Guatemala, 1773–1821; crónica de la emigración de sus imágenes (PDF). tesis doctoral en Historia del Arte (in Spanish). México, D.F.: Universidad Nacional Autónoma de México. Archived from the original (PDF) on 17 December 2014.
- Moncada Maya, J. Omar (2003). En torno a la destrucción de la Ciudad de Guatemala, 1773. Una carta del Ingeniero Militar Antonio Marín. Biblio 3W. Revista Bibliográfica de Geografía y Ciencias Sociales (in Spanish). Vol. VIII. Barcelona: Universidad de Barcelona. ISSN 1138-9796.
- Nolasco Pérez, Pedro (1923). Religiosos de la Merced que pasaron a la América Española...: con documentos del Archivo general de Indias. Biblioteca colonial americana (in Spanish). Centro Oficial de Estudios Americanistas de Sevilla, Tipografía Zarzuela.
