= Iglesia de San Francisco, Antigua Guatemala =

Church of Saint Francis
- Iglesia y convento de San Francisco El Grande (Spanish)
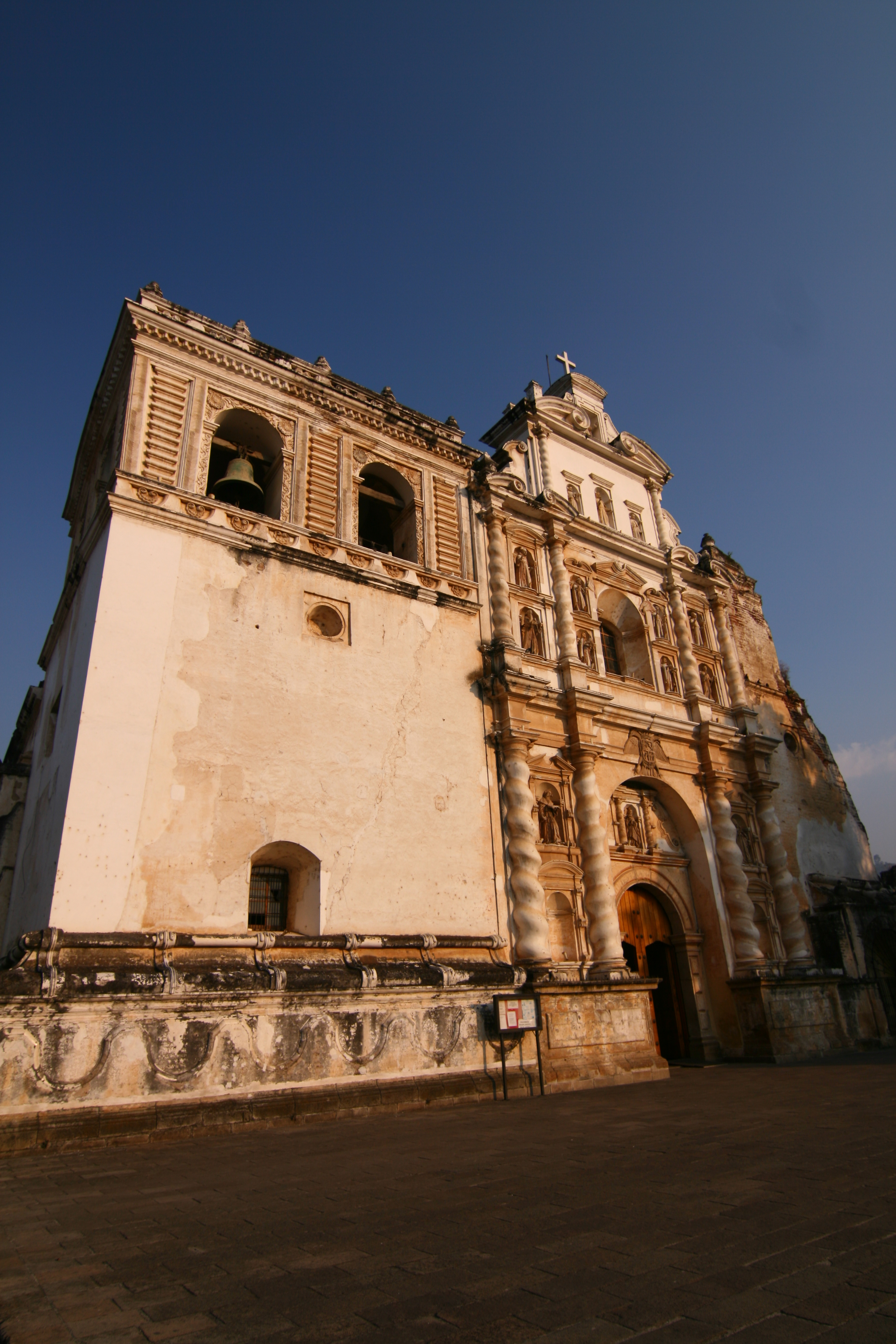
- Church facade

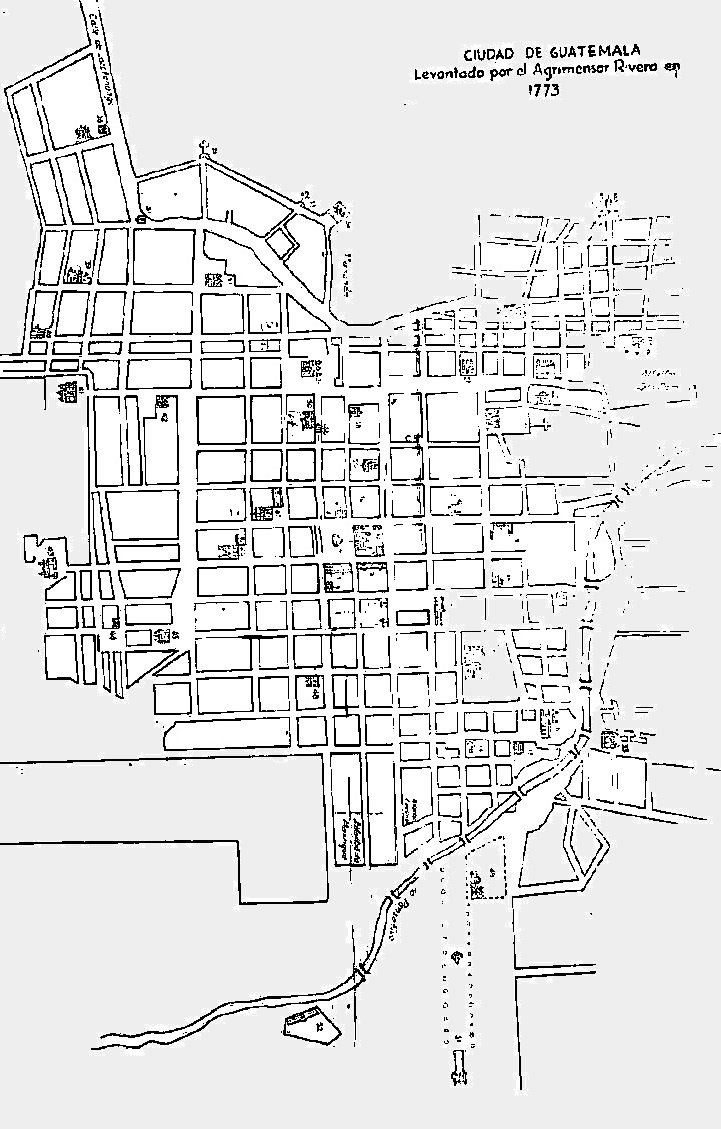
- Location in Antigua Guatemala

General information
- Status: Active Church
- Architectural style: Spanish seismic baroque
- Location: Antigua Guatemala, Guatemala
- Coordinates: 14°33′14.04″N 90°43′45.8394″W
- Completed: 1702
- Inaugurated: 1702
- Destroyed: 1717 Guatemala earthquake; 1751 earthquake; Santa Marta earthquake in 1773; 1917 Guatemala earthquake; 1976 Guatemala earthquake
- Owner: Franciscans

Design and construction
- Architect: Diego de Porres

San Francisco el Grande is a church in Antigua Guatemala, Guatemala and one of the sanctuaries most frequented by the local population because of the shrine of Peter of Saint Joseph Betancur (Santo Hermano Pedro).

== History ==
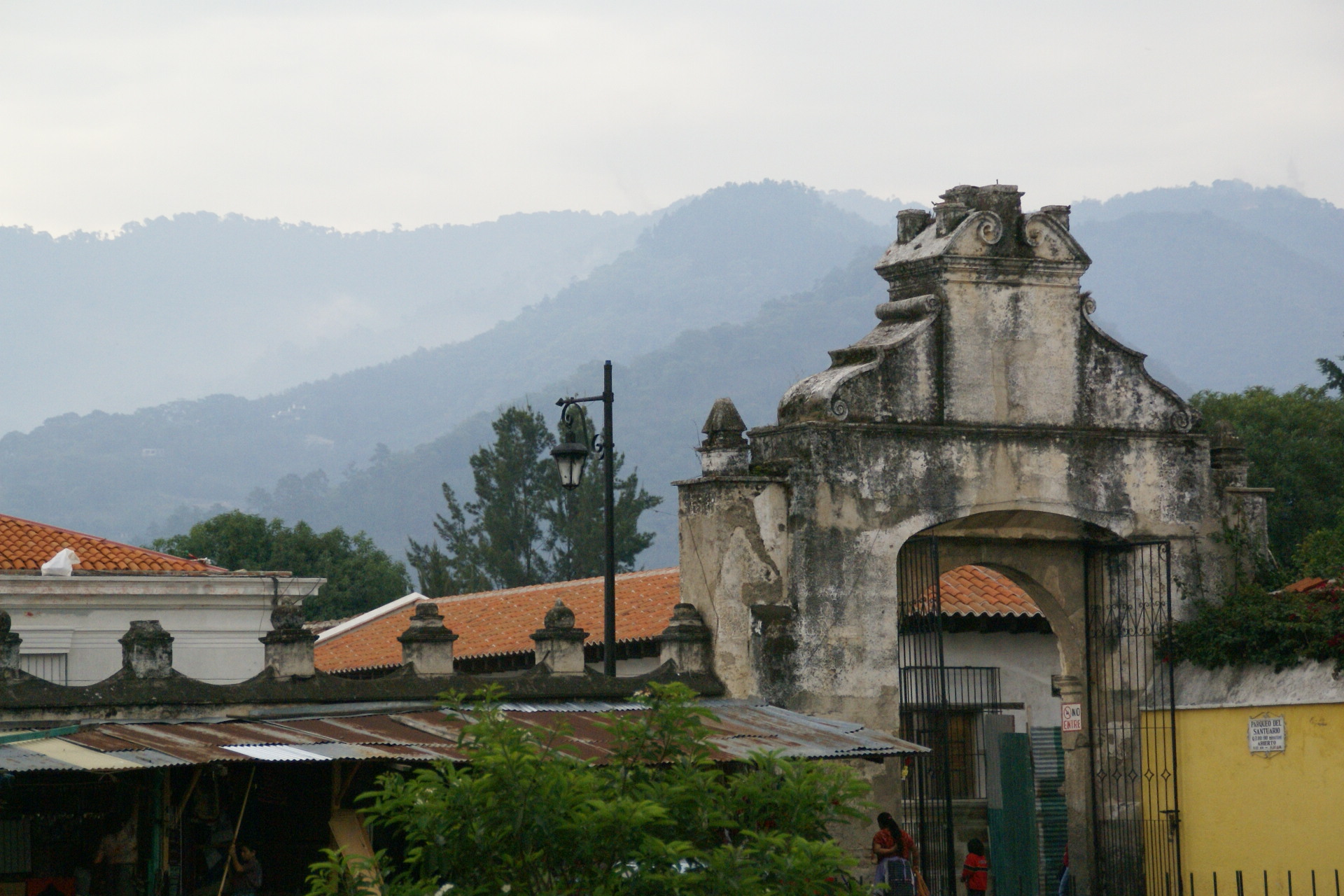
Main entrance to the church property.

When Franciscan missionaries arrived in Guatemala from Spain in 1530 they were assigned 120 villages by the civil authorities. They were the first to move to the Panchoy Valley in 1541 where they built a church at the site of today's School of Christ (Escuela de Cristo). This chapel was severely damaged in 1565 and during the next ten years donations were collected to build a new sanctuary located two blocks away in 1579. Parts of this construction, maybe the only ones in Antigua which date back to the 16th century, can be appreciated at one side of today's sanctuary. San Francisco el Grande became a significant religious and cultural center for the whole region. Theology, law, philosophy, physics and mathematics were taught at San Buenaventura College, located in today's monastery ruins. The college also favoured painters of the colonial era such as Cristóbal de Villalpando, Thomas de Merlo and Alonzo de la Paz.

The chapel and cloister were expanded during the 17th century. In 1684 the structure was reinforced and withstood the earthquake of 1691. The church itself was built by Diego de Porres and inaugurated in 1702. The 1717 earthquake damaged the structure severely. So did the earthquake of 1751. The site was partly destroyed during the 1773 earthquake and has been reconstructed in parts but areas of ruin still remain. The fountain of the main corridor was taken to La Merced's atrium in 1944. The colonial image of the Virgin located behind the main altar fell down during the 1976 earthquake.

== Architecture ==
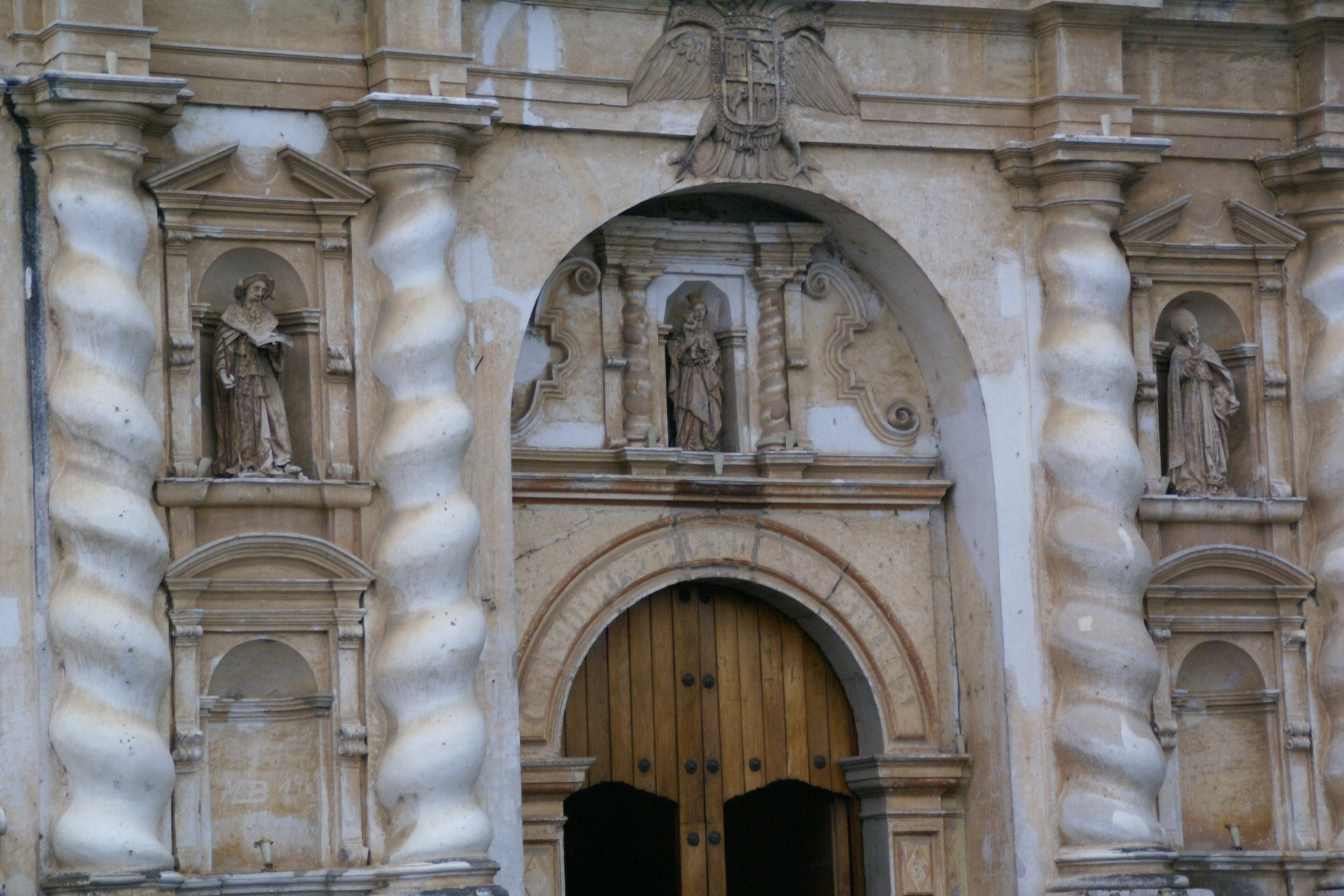
Salomonic columns at the entrance

Its facade, with twisted salomonic columns, is typical of the Spanish-American baroque and is similar to that of San José Cathedral. It has sixteen vaulted niches, each but the lowest two containing a saint or a friar. These include the Virgin Mary, San Diego de Alcalá, San Antonio de Padua, San Juan Capistrano, Santa Clara, Santiago, and Santa Isabel from Hungary. At the entrance of the monastery there are some murals, in which there can be seen the images of some Franciscans friars with a skeleton.

Its bell and clock towers from the 17th and 19th centuries remain in ruins.

The altarpieces inside the church were richly decorated with painting and sculptures of famous contemporary artists.

The church marks the beginning of the Calle los Pasos (Steps Street) which holds the Stations of the Cross and used to be walked solemnly.

== Peter of Saint Joseph Betancur ==
Peter of Saint Joseph Betancur, missionary in Guatemala of Spanish origin, who was beatified 1980 and canonized in 2002, is enshrined at the site. His tomb is visited by thousands of pilgrims each year to beg for favours and miracles.

== In film ==
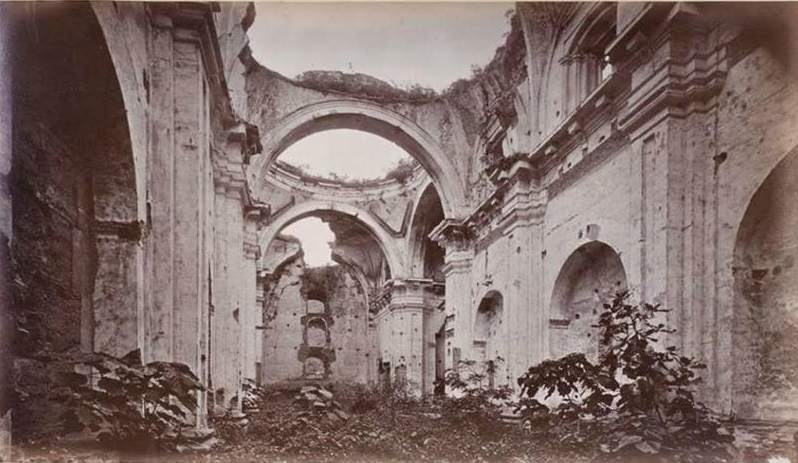
San Francisco Church ruins in 1875; the Green Goddess temple scenes of the movie The New Adventures of Tarzan were filmed at this location in 1935. Photograph by Eadweard Muybridge.

In 1935, the ruins of San Francisco -which was not rebuilt until 1967- were used to film several scenes of the movie The New Adventures of Tarzan, specifically the ones where Tarzan and his fellow explorers are captured by the Green Goddess worshipers and are about to be sacrificed. The filming of the movie took place entirely on location in Guatemala and was made also in Chichicastenango, Livingston, Puerto Barrios, Río Dulce, Tikal, Quiriguá and Guatemala City

== See also ==
- 1773 Guatemala earthquake
- List of places in Guatemala
