= Blas García =

Blas García may refer to:

- Blas García Alcántara (born 1942), Mexican actor
- Blas García Montero (born 1995), Argentine footballer
- Blas García Ravelo, Spanish sculptor
