= Church of the Society of Jesus =

The Church of the Society of Jesus may refer to:

== Churches ==
- Church of the Society of Jesus (Cusco, Peru)
- Church of the Society of Jesus (Quito, Ecuador)
- Church and Convent of the Society of Jesus (Antigua Guatemala)
