= Anna Guerra de Jesús =

Catholic holy woman in New Spain (1639–1713)

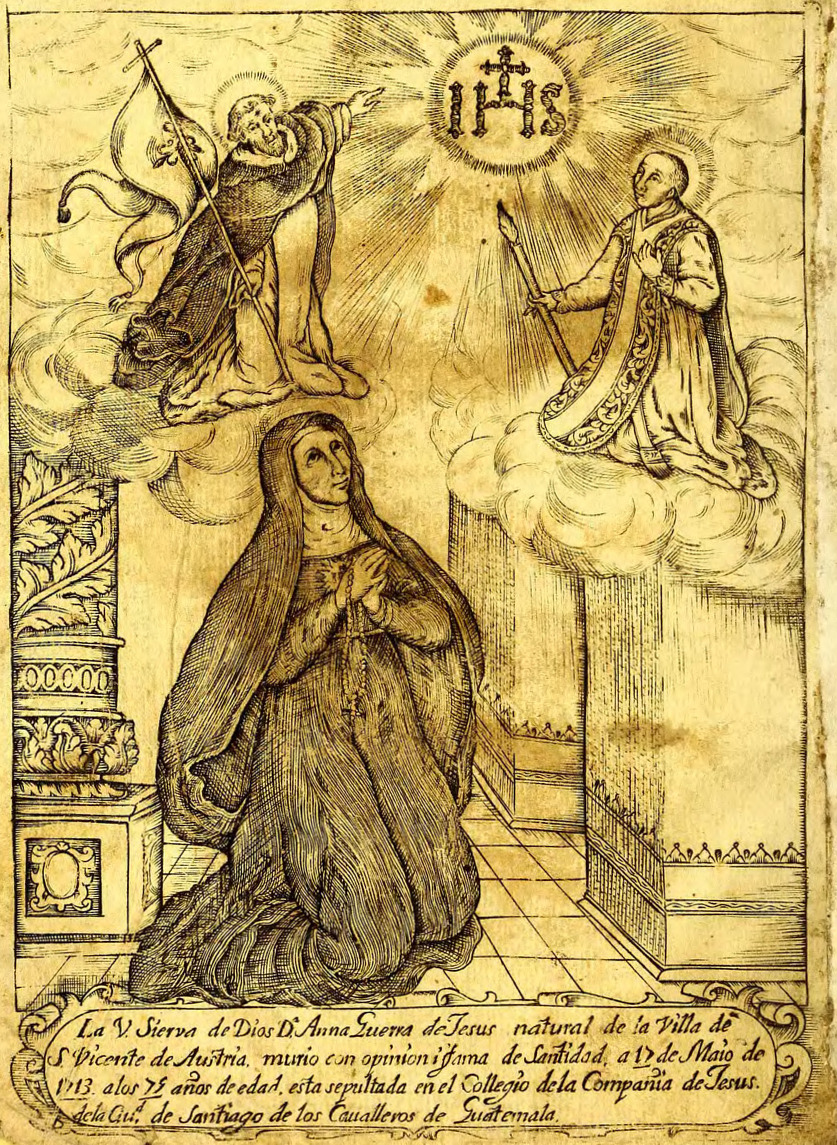
- Born: December 13, 1639; San Vicente
- Died: May 17, 1713 (aged 73); Santiago de los Caballeros de Guatemala

Anna Guerra de Jesús (December 13, 1639 – May 17, 1713) was a Catholic holy woman in New Spain.

Anna Guerra de Jesús was born on December 13, 1639 in the small rural town of San Vicente in present-day El Salvador, the daughter of a Spanish father and criolla mother. At age 16, she married Diego Hernández Vicente and lived on a remote ranch. They had seven children, five of whom died in early childhood. In 1667, the couple and their two surviving children moved to the capitol, Santiago de los Caballeros de Guatemala. Eight months later, her husband abandoned the family for fourteen years.

In 1670, she embraced an ascetic, religious life, learning to read in order to study devotional texts, praying for hours and taking communion and confession several times a week. She had mystical visions and reportedly bilocated to Petén. Initially rejected by Jesuits when seeking a confessor and unable to serve in a religious position beyond being a laywoman due to her marriage, she was soon celebrated for her piety and endurance of suffering.

Anna Guerra de Jesús died on 17 May 1713 in Santiago de los Caballeros de Guatemala. She was buried alongside Jesuit priests in the Iglesia y Convento de la Compañía de Jesús, her epitath reading “she died with the recognition and the fame of holiness.” In 1716, her confessor Padre Antonio Siria published Vida admirable y prodigiosas virtudes de la v. sierva de Dios D. Anna Guerra de Jesús ("Admirable Life and Extraordinary Virtues of the Servant of God, D. Anna Guerra de Jesús").
