= Martín de Andújar Cantos =

Spanish sculptor and architect

- Born: 1602; Province of Albacete
- Died: unknown
- Education: trained by Juan Martínez Montañés
- Occupations: sculptor and architect
- Known for: one of Tenerife's most noted sculptors

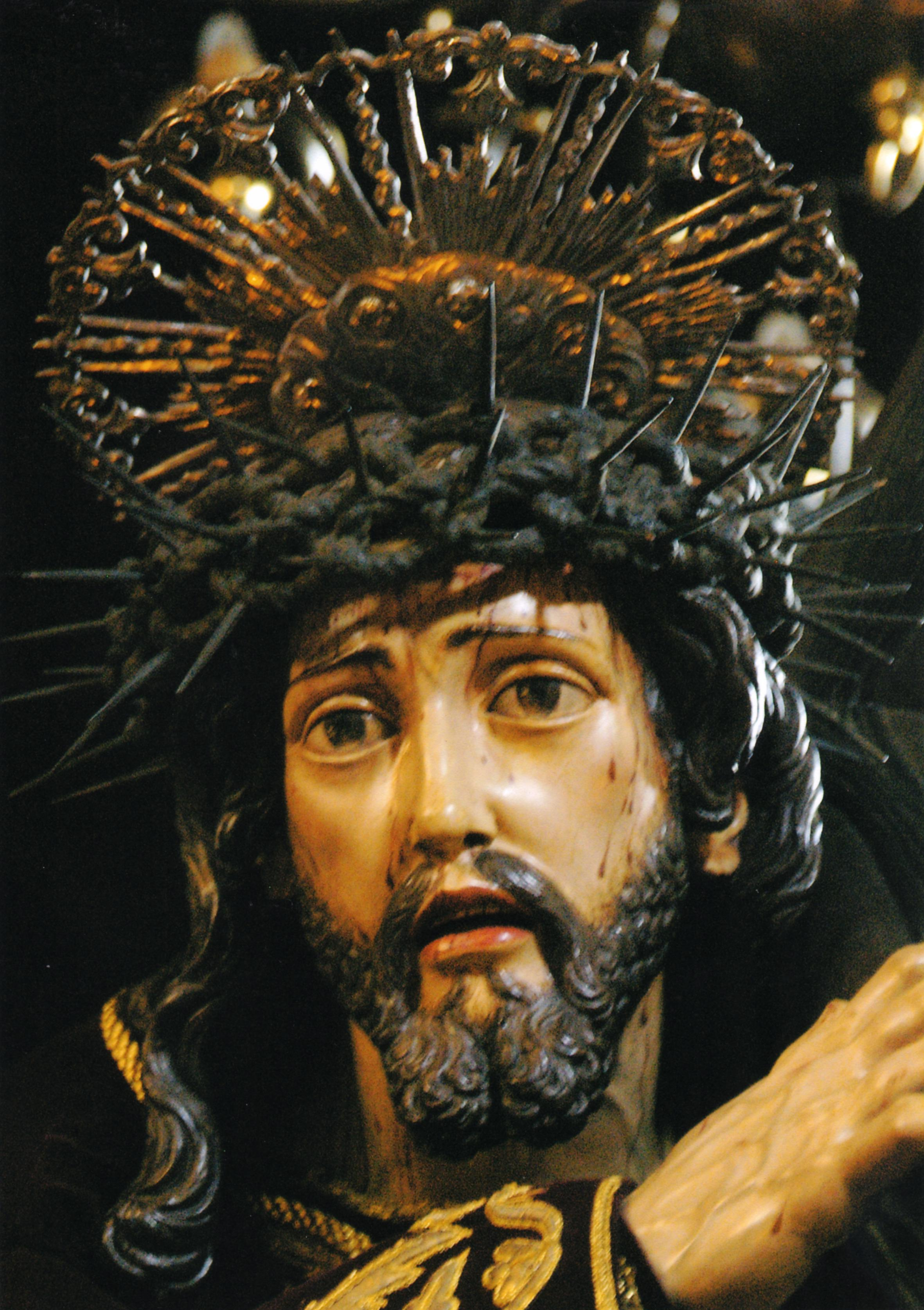
The Nazareno is one of Andújar Cantos' most notable works.

Martín de Andújar Cantos (born 1602 in the Province of Albacete) was a Spanish sculptor and architect. He spent much of his life in Tenerife and is considered one of the island's most noted sculptors. Trained by Juan Martínez Montañés, he himself was a teacher of Blas García Ravelo.
