= Blas García Montero =

Argentine professional footballer

Personal information
- Date of birth: 8 December 1995 (age 30)
- Place of birth: Saladillo, Argentina
- Position: Defender

Youth career
- Argentino de Rojas

Senior career*
Years	Team	Apps	(Gls)
2015–2019	Almirante Brown	58	(1)
- * Club domestic league appearances and goals as of 15:45, 20 April 2019 (UTC)

Blas García Montero (born 8 December 1995) is an Argentine professional footballer who plays as a defender.

== Career ==
García Montero began with the Argentino de Rojas academy, before joining Almirante Brown. He was selected thirty-three times for the Primera B Metropolitana team in his opening four campaigns, including for his professional bow on 18 September 2015 during a 2–2 home draw with Deportivo Merlo. In 2018–19, García Montero scored his first goal versus UAI Urquiza on 12 December 2018. He left in June 2019.

== Career statistics ==
As of 3 July 2020.

Appearances and goals by club, season and competition
Club	Season	League			Cup		League Cup		Continental		Other		Total	
Club	Season	Division	Apps	Goals	Apps	Goals	Apps	Goals	Apps	Goals	Apps	Goals	Apps	Goals
Almirante Brown	2015	Primera B Metropolitana	4	0	0	0	—		—		0	0	4	0
Almirante Brown	2016	Primera B Metropolitana	2	0	0	0	—		—		0	0	2	0
Almirante Brown	2016–17	Primera B Metropolitana	5	0	0	0	—		—		0	0	5	0
Almirante Brown	2017–18	Primera B Metropolitana	22	0	0	0	—		—		0	0	22	0
Almirante Brown	2018–19	Primera B Metropolitana	25	1	0	0	—		—		0	0	25	1
Career total			58	1	0	0	—		—		0	0	58	1
