= Blas García Ravelo =

Spanish sculptor

Blas García Ravelo was a Spanish sculptor of the 17th century from Tenerife. A pupil of Martín de Andújar Cantos, he is considered one of the island's most noted sculptors.
