= Iglesia y Convento de la Compañía de Jesús, Antigua Guatemala =

Convent and Church of the Society of Jesus
- Iglesia y Convento de la Compañía de Jesús (Spanish)
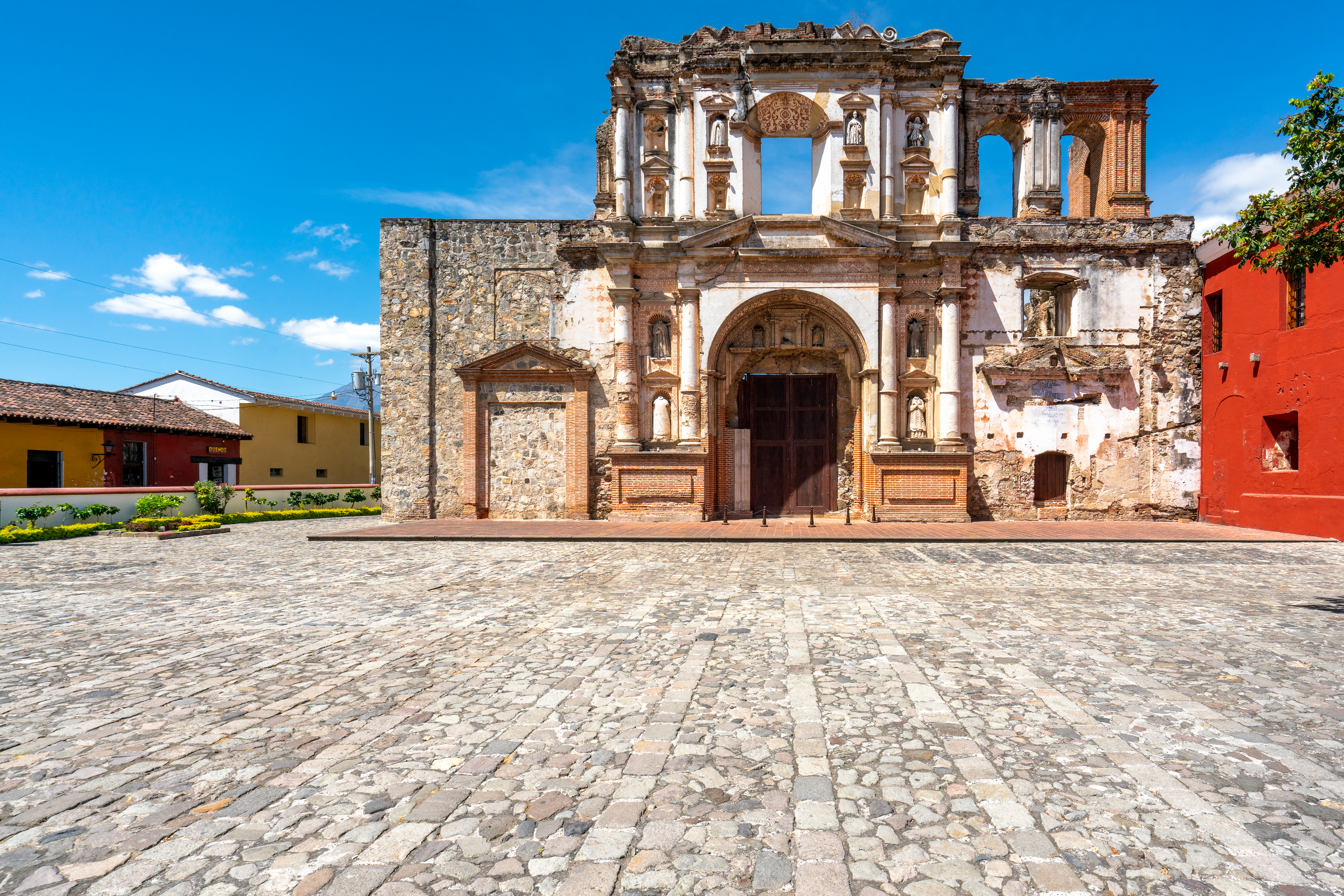

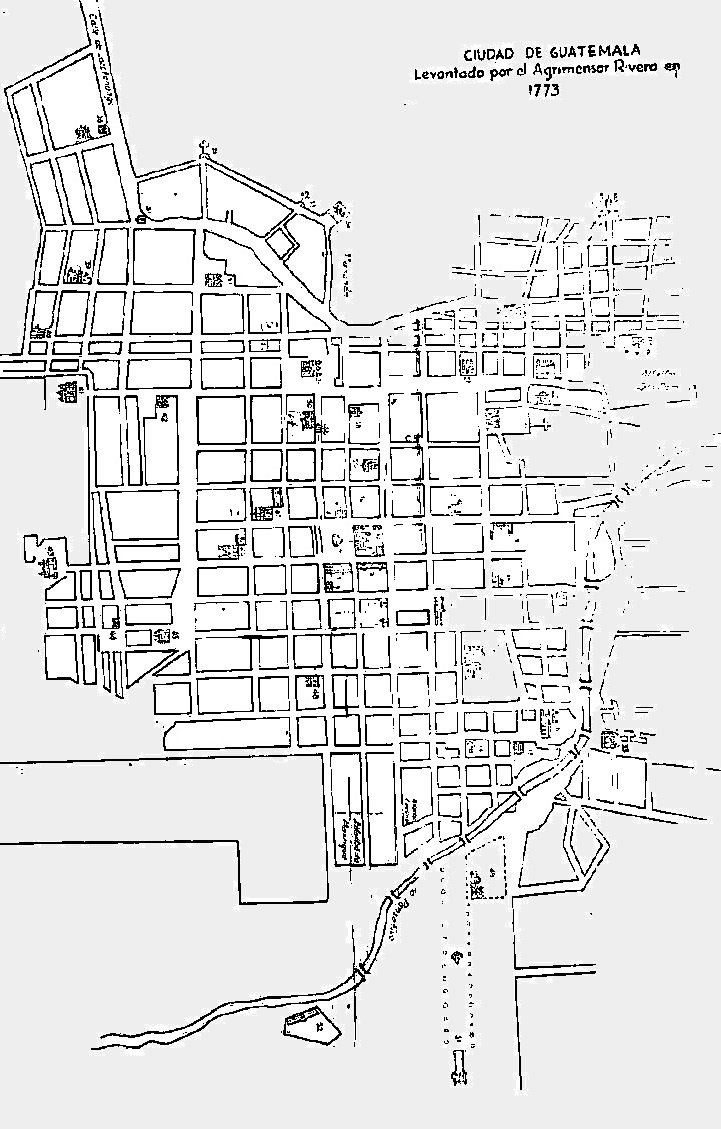
- Location in Antigua Guatemala

General information
- Architectural style: Spanish seismic baroque
- Location: Antigua Guatemala, Guatemala
- Coordinates: 14°33′27″N 90°44′08″W
- Construction started: 1690
- Completed: October 21, 1698
- Destroyed: 1717 earthquake; 1751 earthquake; Santa Marta earthquake in 1773; 1917 Guatemala earthquake; 1976 Guatemala earthquake
- Owner: Cooperación Española-AECID

Design and construction
- Architect: José de Porres

The Church and convent of the Society of Jesus in Antigua Guatemala is a religious complex that was built between 1690 and 1698. It was built on a block that is only 325 yards (300 m) away from the Cathedral of Saint James on a lot that once belonged to the family of famous chronicler Bernal Díaz del Castillo and had three monastery wings and a church. There were only a maximum of 13 Jesuit priest at any given time in the building, but they also hosted Jesuit brothers and secular students. In the building was the San Lucas School of the Society of Jesus, until the Jesuits were expelled from the Spanish colonies in 1767.

== History ==
=== Arrival of the Society of Jesus to Guatemala ===
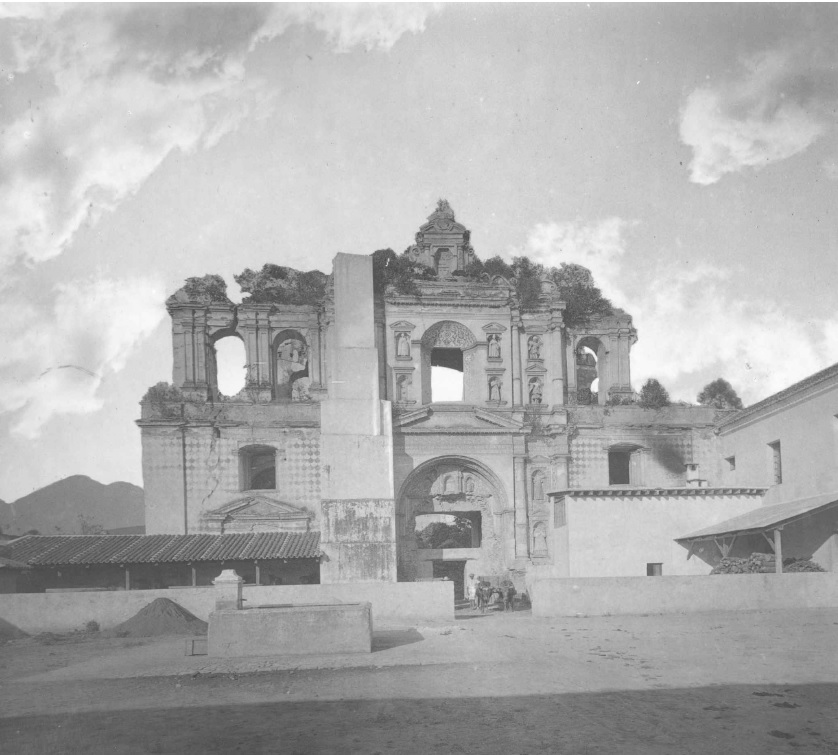
Society of Jesus church ruins in 1880.

In the second half of the 16th Century, the prestige of the Society of Jesus was extraordinary all over Europe, and the Capitanía General of Guatemala requested a group of Jesuits on August 9, 1561. The first petition was denied by King Felipe II as he needed the order member to remain in Spain to lead the Counter Reform efforts. Five years later, however, Felipe II himself asked for twenty four Jesuit priest to be sent to the Americas, but due to several issues this could not be done. In 1580, on his way back from a visit to Peruvian schools, Master Priest Juan de la Plaza stopped by Guatemala and make several petitions to the criollo City Hall such that by 1607 the first Jesuits arrived to Santiago de los Caballeros de Goathemala.

At that time, there were several magnificent buildings already in the city - the Cathedral of Saint James, the Royal Palace and the Noble City Hall-; besides, several regular orders had started their complexes as well. Initially, the Jesuits stayed at Lucas Hurtado house. (Note: In 1607, the Jesuit Province Catalog for the New Spain mentions "Missio Guatemalenses" for the first time, without saying whether it is a monastery or a school, which shows the interim status of the mission. The original Missio was formed by four priests and three Jesuit brothers who did not have educational chores yet.) Given that education was the primary goal of the Society, the Jesuits made an effort to open a school; the San Lucas School opened on October 18, 1607. Saint Luke was well respected by the Society of Jesus and therefore the school was named after him.

=== Church construction ===
Thanks to the generous donation from Chavarri, the Jesuits bought two lots on the east side of the place. On this side, where eventually the entrance to the church would be built, began the construction of the second church. In August 1655, the Society finally bought the whole lot from the Díaz del Castillo; by then, San Lucas School was well known in the region and it even granted two university degrees before the Royal and Pontifical University of San Carlos Borromeo was authorized by the King and Pope. In 1653, the San Lucas School had a staff of only thirteen priests, a very small number compared to the size of the building; the Jesuits, however, made a major impact on the cultural and educational life in the Capitanía General of Guatemala. The school was the city's most prestigious and from it graduated most of the elite members of society of the time. Most of its students were secular and went on to get the best positions in the country after graduating from the Royal and Pontifical University of San Carlos.

By 1690, José de Porres began construction of the second church. The actual construction process lasted eight year and was made possible thanks to generous donations from parishioners; Porres' son, Diego, worked in this project as an apprentice and learned the trade so well, that he eventually became the city master builder. The new church was dedicated on October 21, 1698, which at the time was considered one of the most beautiful across the Spanish America.

=== San Miguel and San Casimiro earthquakes ===
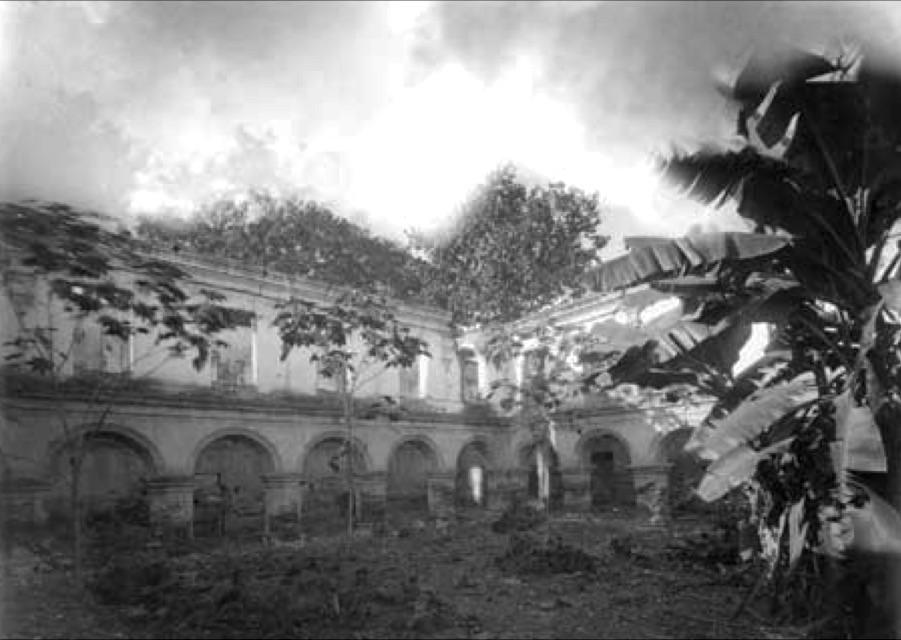
Ruins of the school yard in 1880.

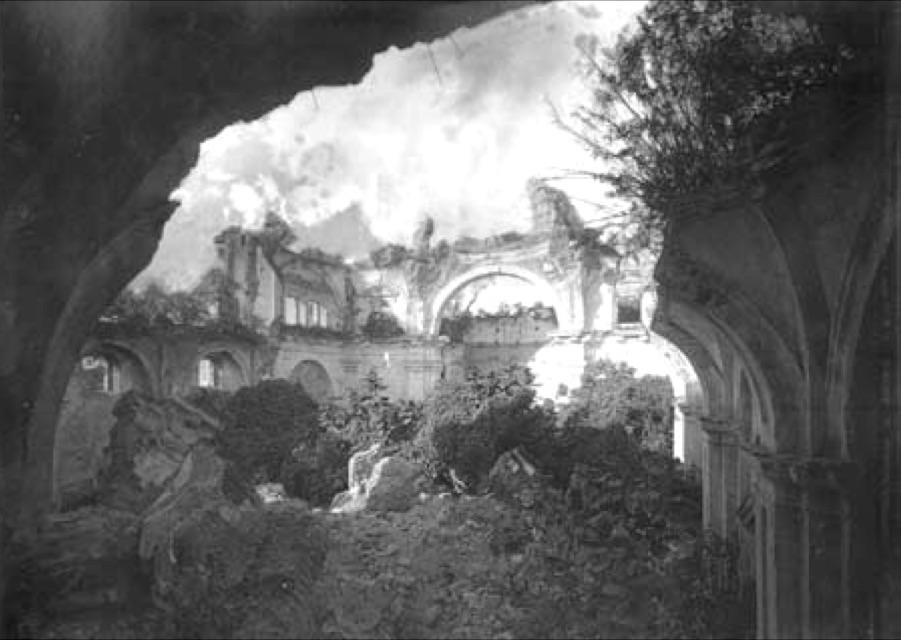
Ruins of the church interior in 1880.

On September 29, 1717, the San Miguel earthquake struck the city and destroyed the San Lucas School building; the tremor cracked the tower and destroyed the top part of the main gate. The master builder of Santiago de Guatemala, Diego de Porres, inspected the damage and calculated that it was necessary to invest between five and six thousand pesos to repair it. Three years later, however, the Jesuits had rebuilt the structure, and when the master builder returned to inspect the building, declared it better and prettier than the original. However, on March 4, 1751, the San Casimiro earthquake destroyed the church roof forcing the Jesuits to once again ask for help to the parishioners to rebuild; once again, the building was among the most beautiful of the city when the repairs were completed.

A prosperity period began after the San Casimiro earthquake, as the city saw major improvements, such as street embellishment and tap water system introduction. A new City Hall was built in and on July 17, 1753, work on the Jesuit plaza in front of the church was finished.

=== Bourbon Reforms and expulsion of the Society of Jesus ===
In 1765 the Spanish King decreed the Bourbon Reforms, which tried to recover the power of the King over the Spanish colonies and increase tax collection for the Crown. Besides administrative redistributions, the Spanish King set a policy aimed to decrease the power of the Catholic Church, which until that moment in time it was absolute over the Spaniards. This policy of diminished church power was based on the Enlightenment and had six main points:

1. Decline of the Jesuit cultural legacy
2. Trend towards a secular culture
3. Cartesianism
4. Paying more value to natural science over religious dogma
5. A severe criticism to the church role within the society. (Note: The King was trying to curve the excessive economic power of some orders and "hermandades", the large numbers of them, the lack of administrative and fiscal control over them, and the public displays of faith -specially the Holy Week processions, thought of now as fanatic and a sign of lack of social development.)
6. Royalism

The "Casa de Ejercicios" -"House of Spiritual Exercises"-, next to the San Lucas School was finished in 1767, but on April 2 of that year king Carlos III signed the Pragmatic Sanction by which he ordered the Society of Jesus to be expelled from all of his kingdom domains. The order members in Guatemala were gathered, their properties confiscated and taken away from San Lucas school in the early hours of July 1, 1767 and then they were sent to the Gulf of Honduras, where there was a ship waiting for them to be taken abroad. The San Lucas school building was closed y the San Borja one was given to another regular order. The properties of the Jesuits were auctioned by a royal commission that took care of temporary real state. By May 22, 1770, it was decided to use the Jesuits properties as seminaries, missions, inns, schools and hospitals.

=== Santa Marta earthquake ===
The terrible Santa Marta earthquake, which destroyed the city on June 29, 1773, practically demolished the church and sections of the convent. Its cloisters and towers were in ruins, the walls were at dangerous angles and the "Casa de Ejercicios" was turned into rubble.

By a Royal decree of July 21, 1775, the city move to the "Virgin valley" was authorized. This was a final order that had to be obeyed by all the people, who started to move slowly, starting on December of that year. In order to build the new city it was necessary to get construction material from the old abandoned churches in Santiago de Guatemala. However, in the case of the Society of Jesus church, there was strong opposition from the neighbors to any possible dismantling of the structure since they considered that it could still be repaired.

=== After the capital moved to La Ermita ===
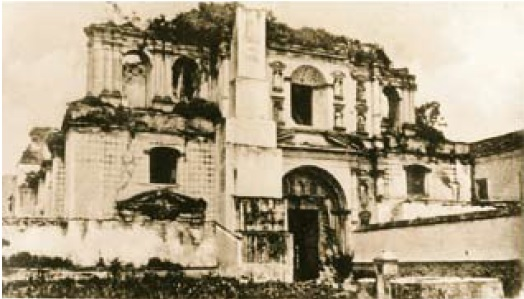
Society of Jesus monastery ruins in 1900.

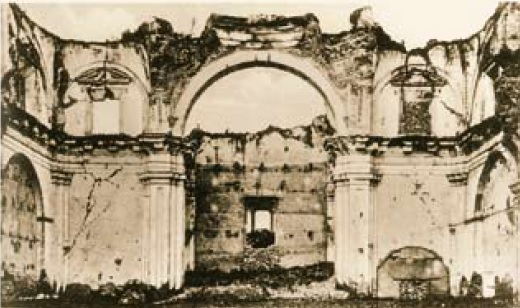
Society of Jesus church interior ruins in 1900.

After the independence of Guatemala from Spain in 1821, the Jesuit complex became public property once again and was in several lawsuits that lasted until 1829, when the regular clergy and the conservative Aycinena clan were expelled from Central America after the invasion of liberal general Francisco Morazán and the establishment of a secular government. The new liberal government decreed that all the confiscated Catholic church possessions had to be turned into elementary schools and university classrooms.

In 1843, conservative president Rafael Carrera authorized the Society of Jesus to return to Guatemala advised by priest and high rank conservative Juan José de Aycinena y Piñol; however, due to the constant wars against liberal regimes in Central America, the return of the Jesuits could not materialize until 1851, after Carrera was solidly in power. They were given the Trentin School in Guatemala City, but it is not known if they tried to recover their properties in Antigua Guatemala. By 1865, the building was functioning as a vapor activated thread mill, but it was not profitable due to a lack of expert technicians and raw material; and by 1872, the Jesuits were once again expelled from Guatemala by the liberal regime of Justo Rufino Barrios.

In 1884 City Hall made an announcement that it intended to transform the old Society of Jesus buildings into a market, in spite of the strong opposition from the neighbors that already had small shops on the plaza. It was until 1912 that a market was placed in the complex.

In 1979 it was included among the monuments that were declared "Patrimony of Humanity" by UNESCO.

== Restoration ==
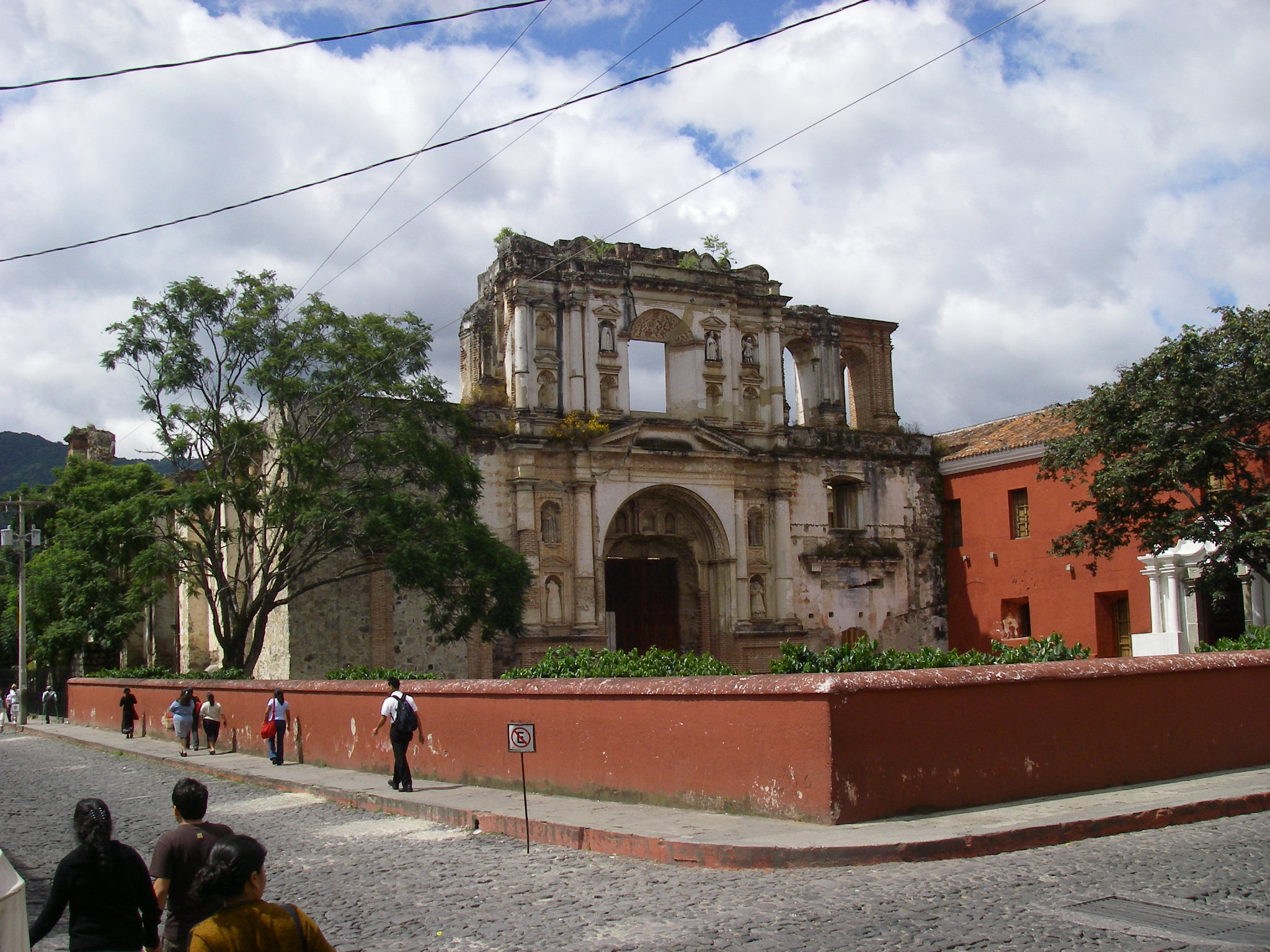
Exterior of the old school in 2010, after its restoration following the earthquakes of 1717 thru 1976.

Later on, it hosted a Guatemalan handcraft product market until 1992, when the International Cooperation Agency for Development from Spain committed to restore the school building in exchange of being able to use it to create an international educational center, with the blessing of the National Council for Antigua Guatemala Protection.

== See also ==
- Antigua Guatemala
- Company of Jesus
- 1773 Guatemala earthquake

== Notes and references ==
=== Bibliography ===
- Agencia Española de Cooperación Internacional para el Desarrollo (2008). Apuntes sobre las obras de rehabilitación del Colegio de la Compañía de Jesús (PDF) (in Spanish). Guatemala. Archived from the original (PDF) on 4 June 2014.
- González Davison, Fernando (2008). La montaña infinita; Carrera, caudillo de Guatemala (in Spanish). Guatemala: Artemis & Edinter. ISBN 978-84-89452-81-7.
- Hernández de León, Federico (1930). El libro de las efemérides (in Spanish). Vol. Tomo III. Guatemala: Tipografía Sánchez y de Guise.
- Melchor Toledo, Johann Estuardo (2011). El arte religioso de la Antigua Guatemala, 1773-1821; crónica de la emigración de sus imágenes (PDF). tesis doctoral en Historia del Arte (in Spanish). México, D.F.: Universidad Nacional Autónoma de México. Archived from the original (PDF) on 17 December 2014.
