= List of Central American writers =

This is a list of notable writers from Central America.

== Belize ==
- Zee Edgell
- Kalilah Enríquez
- George Gabb
- Samuel Alfred Haynes
- Evan X Hyde
- Corinth Morter Lewis
- Yasser Musa
- Adele Ramos
- Thomas Vincent Ramos
- John Alexander Watler

== Costa Rica ==
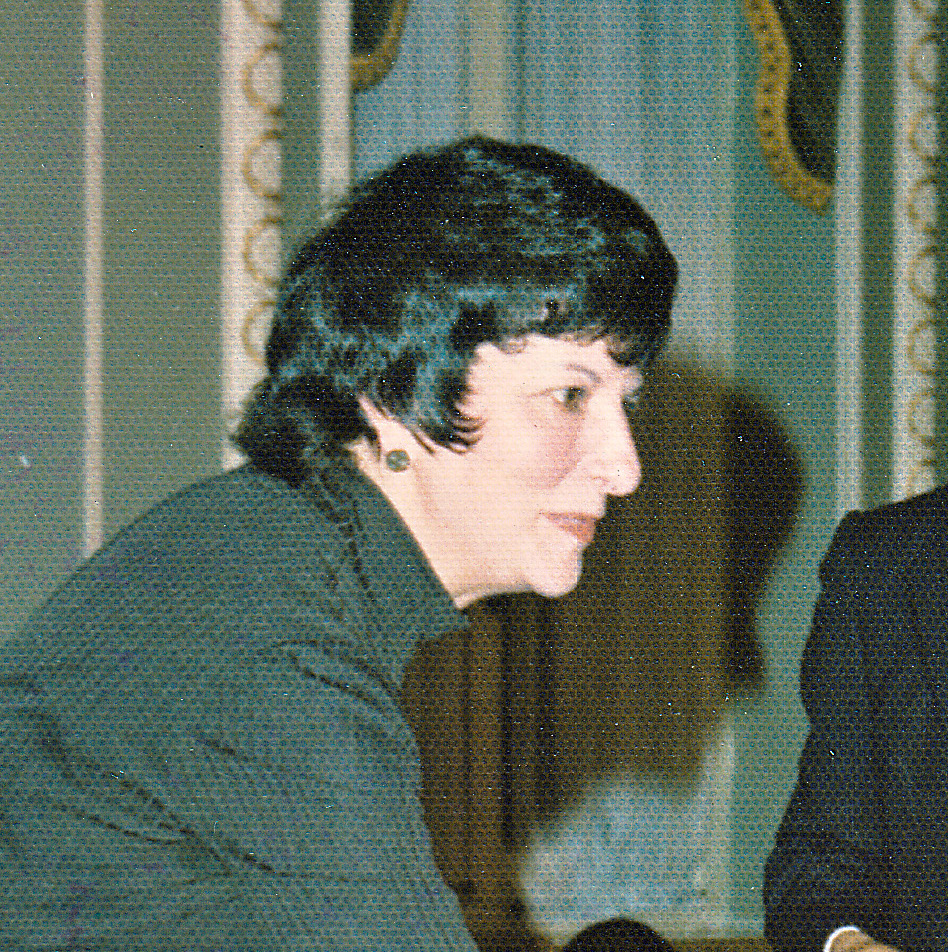
Costa Rican writer Carmen Naranjo.

- Sara Casal de Quirós
- Alfonso Chase
- Jorge Debravo
- Mirta González Suárez
- Joaquín Gutiérrez
- Carlos Luis Fallas
- Carmen Lyra
- Carmen Naranjo
- Eunice Odio
- Julieta Pinto
- Eugenio Rodríguez Vega
- Evelyn Ugalde

== El Salvador ==
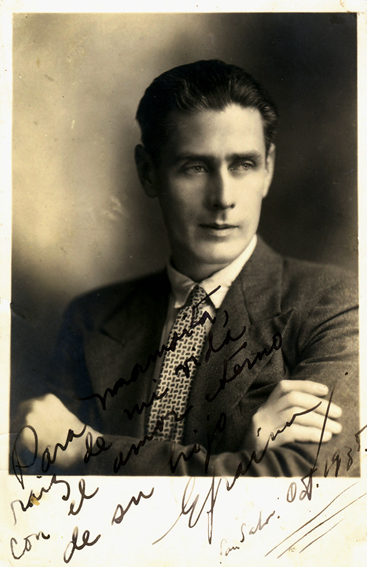
Salvadordan writer Luis Salvador Efraín Salazar Arrué, known as Salarrué.

- Manlio Argueta
- Juan José Cañas
- Horacio Castellanos Moya
- Roque Dalton
- Jacinta Escudos
- Alfredo Espino
- Francisco Gavidia
- Claudia Lars
- Dina Posada
- Lil Milagro Ramírez
- Salarrué

== Guatemala ==
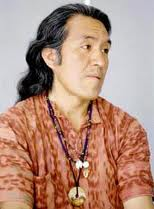
Humberto Akʼabal, a Kʼicheʼ Maya poet from Guatemala.

- Angelina Acuña
- Humberto Akʼabal
- Miguel Ángel Asturias
- Isabel de los Ángeles Ruano
- Margarita Azurdia
- Margarita Carrera
- Otto René Castillo
- Julia Esquivel
- Marco Antonio Flores
- Romelia Alarcón Folgar
- Alaíde Foppa
- María Josefa García Granados
- Francisco Antonio de Fuentes y Guzmán
- Juana de la Concepción
- Luis de Lión
- Francisco Méndez
- Luz Méndez de la Vega
- Augusto Monterroso
- Javier Payeras
- Victor Perera
- Ana María Rodas
- Julio Serrano Echeverría
- Magdalena Spínola
- Aida Toledo
- Boris Amado
- Carlos Wyld Ospina
- Teresa Bolaños de Zarco

== Honduras ==
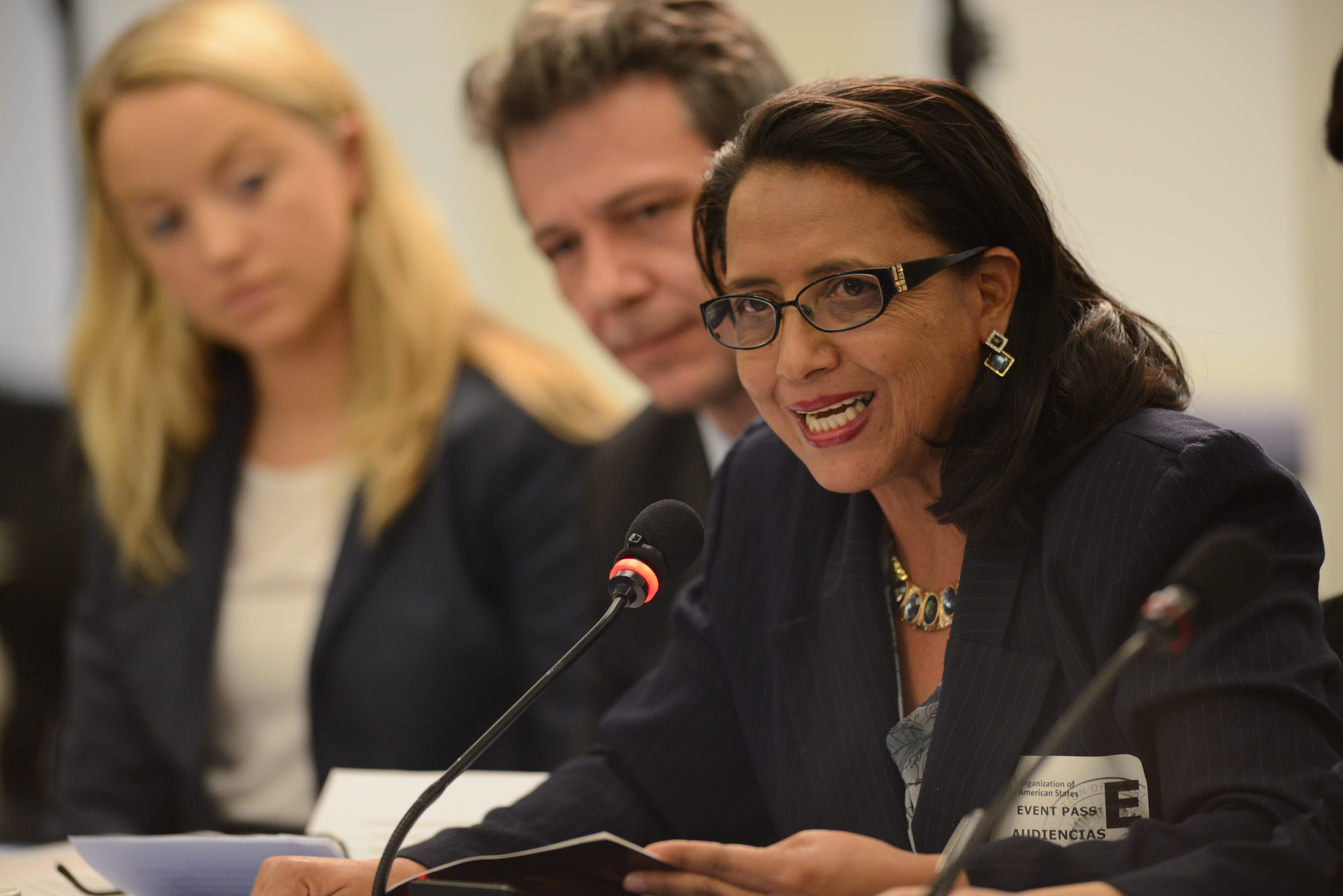
Honduran journalist Dina Meza.

- Ramón Amaya Amador
- Eduardo Bähr
- Graciela Bográn
- Oriel María Siu
- Amanda Castro
- Augusto Coello
- Argentina Díaz Lozano
- Julio Escoto
- Javier Abril Espinoza
- Juan Pablo Suazo Euceda
- Lucila Gamero de Medina
- Dina Meza
- Paca Navas
- Juana Pavón
- Clementina Suárez
- Ángela Valle

== Panama ==
- Rosa María Britton
- José Luis Rodríguez Pittí
- Gloria Guardia
- Gustavo A. Mellander Navarro
