= List of Guatemalan women writers =

This is a list of women writers who were born in Guatemala or whose writings are closely associated with that country.

== A ==
- Angelina Acuña (1905–2006), poet specializing in the classical sonnet form
- Isabel de los Ángeles Ruano (born 1945), novelist, poet, journalist
- Margarita Azurdia (1931–1998), painter, sculptor, poet
- Ana Maria Rodas (1937), poet, narrator and essayist, is considered one of the great figures

== C ==
- Margarita Carrera (1929–2018), poet, essayist, academic
- Rosina Cazali (born 1960), art critic, columnist
- Ana Cofiño (born 1955), researcher, anthropologist, editor, and historian

== D ==
- Margaret A. Dix (1939–2025), Jersey-born botanist, educator, scientific works on biology and the environment
- Marta Yolanda Díaz-Durán, journalist, educator

== G ==
- Natalia Górriz (1868–?), biographer, non-fiction writer, pedagogue
- María Josefa García Granados (1796–1848), poet, journalist, early feminist

== H ==
- Elisa Hall de Asturias (1900–1982) author, feminist

== L ==
- Alcina Lubitch Domecq (born 1953), short story writer, now living in Israel

== M ==
- Rigoberta Menchú (born 1959), Nobel Peace Prize winner, autobiographer
- Luisa Moreno (1907–1992), civil rights activist, pamphlet writer
- Lucrecia Méndez (born 1943), academic, literary critic
- Luz Méndez de la Vega (1919–2012) feminist writer, poet, journalist, academic, actress

== P ==
- Dina Posada (born 1946), acclaimed Salvadoran-Guatemalan poet

== R ==
- Ana María Rodas (born 1937), journalist, poet

== S ==
- Magdalena Spínola, (1896–1991) poet, journalist, teacher

== T ==
- Aida Toledo (born 1952), poet, short story writer, educator

== V ==
- Vania Vargas (born 1978), poet, narrator, editor and cultural journalist

== Z ==
- Carol Zardetto, contemporary novelist, theatre critic, author of Con pasión absoluta (2007)

== See also ==
- List of women writers
- List of Spanish-language authors
