= Guatemalan literature =

Works written by Guatemalan authors

Guatemalan literature is literature written by Guatemalan authors, whether in the indigenous languages present in the country or in Spanish. Though there was likely literature in Guatemala before the arrival of the Spanish, all the texts that exist today were written after their arrival.

Guatemalan poet and novelist Miguel Ángel Asturias won the Nobel Prize in Literature in 1967. Other notable Guatemalan authors include José Milla y Vidaurre, José Batres Montúfar, and Rafael Arévalo Martínez. Resistance literature has played a role in the history of Guatemala.

== Literature in Mayan languages ==
The Popol Vuh is the most significant work of Guatemalan literature in the Quiché language, and one of the most important of Pre-Columbian American literature. It is a compendium of Mayan stories and legends, aimed to preserve Mayan traditions. The first known version of this text dates from the 16th century and is written in Quiché transcribed in Latin characters. It was translated into Spanish by the Dominican priest Francisco Ximénez in the beginning of the 18th century. Due to its combination of historical, mythical, and religious elements, it has been called the Mayan Bible. It is a vital document for understanding the culture of pre-Columbian America.

The Rabinal Achí is a dramatic work consisting of dance and text that is preserved as it was originally represented. It is thought to date from the 15th century and narrates the mythical and dynastic origins of the Kek'chi' people, and their relationships with neighboring peoples. The story tells how the prince of the Kek'chi' fights against neighboring tribes and, while he initially defeats them, he later is captured and taken before the king Job'Toj, who gives him back to his people to say goodbye to and dance with his princess for the last time. The Rabinal Achí is performed during the Rabinal festival of January 25, the day of Saint Paul. It was declared a masterpiece of oral tradition of humanity by UNESCO in 2005.

== Colonial period: 16th - 19th centuries ==
The 16th century saw the first native-born Guatemalan writers that wrote in Spanish. Major writers of this era include Sor Juana de Maldonado, considered the first poet playwright of colonial Central America, and the historian Francisco Antonio de Fuentes y Guzmán. The Jesuit Rafael Landívar (1731–1793) is considered as the first great Guatemalan poet. He was forced into exile by Carlos III. He traveled to Mexico and later to Italy, where he died. He originally wrote his Rusticatio Mexicana and his poems praising the bishop Figueredo y Victoria in Latin.

At this time, traditional poetic forms were developed to be sung. These include the villancico for use on the eves of main religious holidays. These were the only liturgical occasions on which songs in vernacular languages were permitted. (All other events were exclusively in Latin.) In Guatemala, as throughout the Spanish empire, other musical compositions with Spanish lyrics included sainetes, jácaras, tonadas, and cantatas. Authors of these poems, who also put their works to music, include Manuel José de Quirós (ca. 1765-1790), Pedro Nolasco Estrada Aristondo, Pedro Antonio Rojas, and Rafael Antonio Castellanos (ca. 1725-1791). Castellanos is one of the most important in the Hispanic world and in the music of Guatemala.

During the 18th century, Guatemalan literature was influenced by French neoclassicism, as is seen in educational and philosophical works by authors such as Rafael García Goyena and Matías de Córdoba.

== Guatemalan literature after independence: the nineteenth century ==
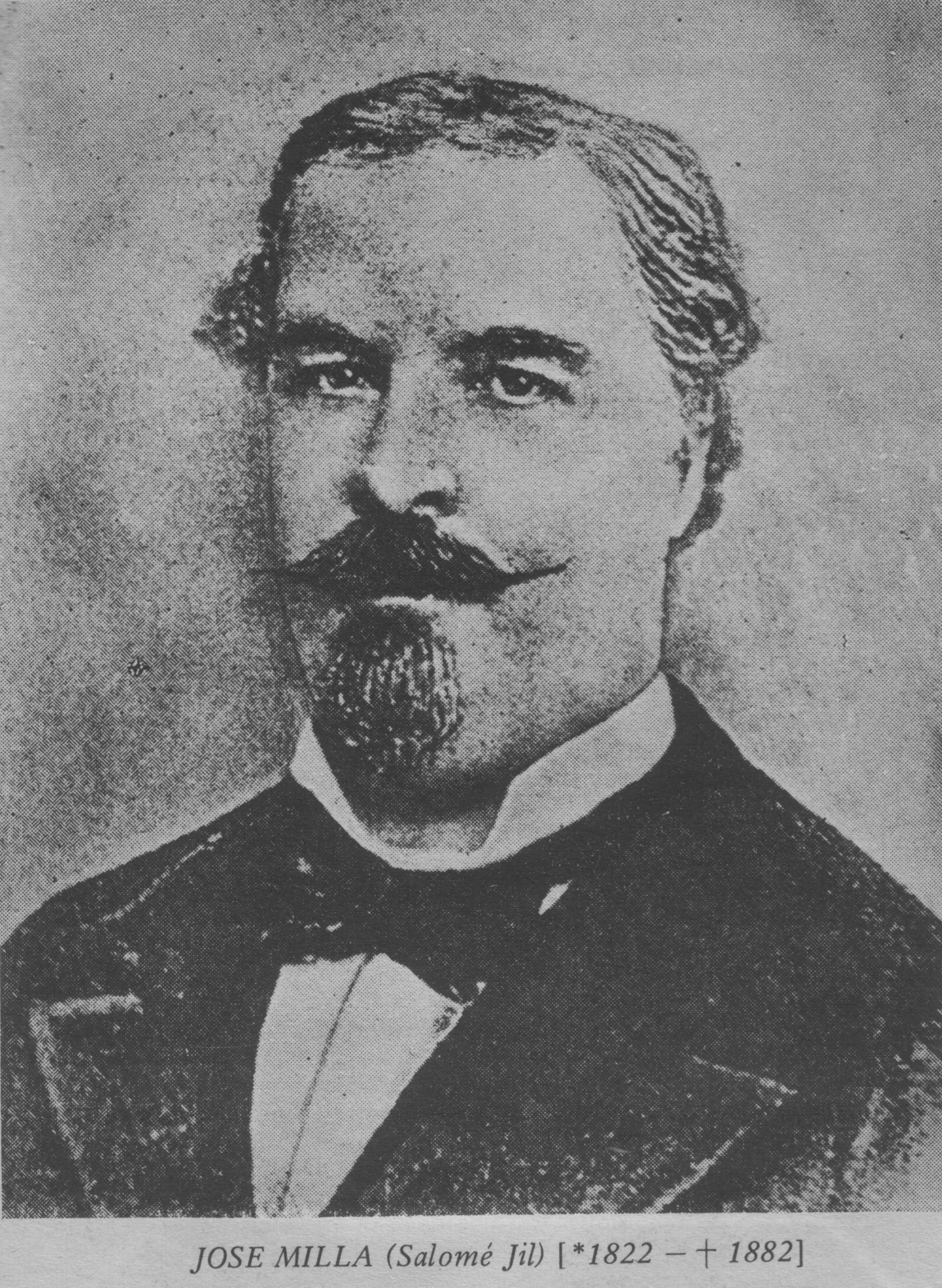
Salomé Gil

Guatemala gained independence from Spain in 1821, in its desire to establish political and commercial relations with other countries. The literature during this period is marked by political strife, which dominated the essay and treatise genres. This era also saw the birth of journalism in Guatemala, with figures like Antonio José de Irisarri.

During the 19th century Guatemalan literature began to develop independently from Spanish literature, though it continued to incorporate European influences. Important writers of this era include María Josefa García Granados and José Batres Montúfar (known simply as "Pepe Batres"), who co-wrote the "Sermón para José María Castilla", a work that was scandalous at the time. Batres is also the author of the poem "Yo pienso en ti", one of the best known of Guatemalan literature.

In the second half of the 19th century, the novel dominated Guatemalan literature, thanks especially to José Milla y Vidaurre, considered the father of the Guatemalan novel. He signed some of his works with the pseudonym "Salomé Jil", an anagram of his name. Major works by Milla y Vidaurre include La hija del Adelantado (1866), Los Nazarenos (1867), El visitador (1867), and El libro sin nombre.

Guatemalan writers also participated in Latin American modernism, heir to French symbolism and Parnassianism and driven by the Nicaraguan Rubén Darío. In poetry, important writers included Domingo Estrada, Máximo Soto Hall, and María Cruz. The versatile writer Enrique Gómez Carrillo represented modernism in prose.

== Twentieth century ==
In the 20th century, Guatemalan literature reached a level comparable to that of other Latin American countries. The most important Guatemalan writers in this period are novelist Miguel Ángel Asturias (1967 Nobel Prize winner and author of novels including El Señor Presidente and Hombres de Maíz), poet Luis Cardoza y Aragón, short story writer and novelist Augusto Monterroso (2000 Príncipe de Asturias prize winner), and playwright Carlos Solórzano. In general, 20th-century Guatemalan literature is strongly influenced by politics, as evidenced by the fact that its authors were forced into exile during Guatemala's successive dictatorships and civil wars.

20th-century Guatemalan literature is usually divided by generation or decade:

- The generation of 1910 or "the Comet"
- The generation of 1920
- The generation of 1930 or "Grupo Tepeus"
- The generation of 1940 or "Grupo Acento"
- The Grupo Saker-Ti (1944–1954)
- The generation "comprometida" (after 1954)
