= Antonio Flores (disambiguation) =

Antonio Flores (1961–1995) was a Spanish singer-songwriter and actor.

Antonio Flores may also refer to:

- Antonio Flores (footballer, born 1923) (died 2001), Mexican footballer
- Antonio Flores (footballer, born 1972), Spanish football manager
- Antonio Flores Jijón (1833–1915), president of Ecuador
- Antonio Flores de Lemus (1876–1941), Spanish politician and economist
- Juan Antonio Flores Santana (1927–2014), Roman Catholic bishop in the Dominican Republic
- Marco Antonio Flores (1937–2013), Guatemalan author, poet, essayist, journalist and professor
- Nexar Antonio Flores (born 1978), Ecuadorian and Finnish fashion stylist and make-up artist

== See also ==
- Manuel Antonio Flórez (1723–1799), Spanish general
- All pages with titles containing Antonio and Flores separated by other name(s)
