= Miguel Ángel Asturias National Prize in Literature =

The Miguel Ángel Asturias National Prize in Literature (officially in Spanish language: Premio Nacional de Literatura "Miguel Ángel Asturias") is the most important literary award in Guatemala. Sometimes referred to as the "National Literary Prize", it is dedicated to the memory of the Guatemalan writer, statesman, and Nobel Prize winner Miguel Ángel Asturias and is a one-time only award that recognizes an individual writer's body of work.

The Guatemalan National Prize in Literature has been given annually since 1988 by the Ministerio de Cultura y Deportes (es) (Ministry of Culture and Sports) at ceremonies in the Palacio Nacional de la Cultura (National Palace of Culture). The winner receives a gold medal plus a cash award of 50 thousand quetzales.

== Winners of the Miguel Ángel Asturias National Literature Prize ==
1988 – Luis Alfredo Arango – (1935–2001)
1989 – Carlos Solórzano – (born 1922)
1990 – Otto-Raúl González – (1921–2007)
1991 – Dante Liano – (born 1948)
1992 – Enrique Juárez Toledo – (1910–1999)
1993 – Mario Monteforte Toledo – (1911–2003)
1994 – Luz Méndez de la Vega – (born 1919)
1995 – Miguel Ángel Vásquez – (born 1922)
1996 – Margarita Carrera – (1929–2018)
1997 – Augusto Monterroso – (1921–2003)
1998 – Francisco Morales Santos – (born 1940)
1999 – Mario Alberto Carrera – (born 1945)
2000 – Ana María Rodas – (born 1937)
2001 – Isabel de los Ángeles Ruano – (born 1945)
2002 – Julio Fausto Aguilera – (born 1929)
2003 – Humberto Ak'abal, declined – (born 1952)
2004 – Rodrigo Rey Rosa – (born 1958)
2005 – Carlos Navarrete – (born 1931)
2006 – Marco Antonio Flores – (born 1937)
2007 – Mario Roberto Morales – (born 1947)
2008 – Arturo Arias – (born 1950)
2009 – Gerardo Guinea Diez – (born 1955)
2010 – Enrique Noriega – (born 1949)
2011 – Francisco Pérez de Antón – (born 1940)
2012 – Humberto López – (born 1954)
2013 – Víctor Muñoz – (born 1950)
2014 – David Unger (born 1950)
2015 – Carmen Matute
2016 – Delia Quiñónez (born 1946)
2017 – Francisco Alejandro Méndez (born 1964)
2018 – Eduardo Halfon (born 1971)
2019 – Luis Eduardo Rivera (born 1949)
2020 – José Luis Perdomo Orellana (born 1958)
2021 – Rafael Cuevas Molina (born 1954)
2022 – Gloria Hernández (born 1960)
