= Lucrecia Méndez =

Guatemalan university professor, essayist, researcher and literary and art critic

Lucrecia Méndez de Penedo
- Born: Marta Lucrecia Méndez; 21 July 1943 (age 82); Guatemala City, Guatemala
- Occupation(s): Academic, writer
- Years active: 1979-present

Lucrecia Méndez de Penedo (born 21 July 1943) is a Guatemalan university professor, essayist, researcher, and literary and art critic. She has been instrumental in rescuing some of Guatemala's literary heritage from obscurity.

== Biography ==
Marta Lucrecia Méndez was born 21 July 1943. In 1979, she received a degree cum laude in Spanish Literature and letters from the Universidad de San Carlos de Guatemala (University of San Carlos of Guatemala). In 1997, she earned her doctorate cum laude in Literature from the University of Siena in Italy. Both of her graduating theses were analyses of the work of Luis Cardoza y Aragón.

She has been a professor at several Guatemalan universities, including her alma mater, San Carlos; the Universidad del Valle de Guatemala; and Universidad Francisco Marroquín, as well as teaching as a visiting professor in Italy, Spain and the United States. Méndez is the Academic Vice President of Rafael Landívar University, where she has served as Vice Dean of the Faculty of Humanities, Director of the Philosophy and Literature Department, Director of Postgraduate Studies, as well as the coordinator for the Master's program in Latin American Literature.

Mendéz has been both an organizer and participant in numerous conferences, symposia, and events to further higher education. She was the Guatemalan representative for the Institute of Higher Education of Latin America and the Caribbean of UNESCO (IESALC). She has led conferences in Argentina, Belgium, Colombia, Cuba, France, Italy, Mexico, Puerto Rico, Venezuela, as well as multiple locations throughout Central America and the United States. She was also a founding member of the Central American Postgraduate Accreditation Agency (ACAP), to help standardize accreditation across the region.

In addition to teaching and organizing educational events, Mendéz is a writer. She is member of several editorial committees in Guatemala, Mexico and France. Her area of specialization is Guatemalan literature and she has published works on Cardoza y Aragón, Miguel Ángel Asturias, Rafael Arévalo Martínez Enrique Gómez Carrillo, Rafael Landívar and written an anthology in collaboration with Aida Toledo, evaluating short stories of Guatemalan women writers called Mujeres que cuentan, which was published in 2000. Due to the lack of information and study on Guatemalan writer Miguel Angel Asturias Méndez's efforts to rescue his work from obscurity led to recent find in Paris of his works.

Méndez is a full member of the Guatemalan Academy of the Language and a member of the Royal Spanish Academy. She also has a bi-monthly column in the publication Prensa Libre and has published numerous articles and reviews both local and international newspapers, and journals, such as Editorial Rin 78 and Revista Ístmica.

== Awards and recognition ==
- 2000 Presidential Order "Miguel Angel Asturias" Guatemala, National Palace of Culture.
- 2001 Godmother Italian Cultural Institute, headquartered Guatemala.
- 2002 Dante Alighieri Medal, awarded by the Dante Alighieri Society, headquartered Guatemala.
- 2003 Appointed as a Member of the International Scientific Committee of the Archives Association of Latin America, Caribbean and African Literature—XX Siecle Friends of Miguel Ángel Asturias, UNESCO
- 2003 Permanent Civic Recognition Program Industrial Bank (as a representative of the College of Humanities at the Humanist Day).
- 2005 "Palmas Académicas" Award from the Education Ministry of France.
- 2006 "Stella Della Solidarietà" Award from the President of Italy.

== Selected works ==
- La indole polifacetica de Luis Cardozo y Aragón en Guatemala, las lineas de su mano Guatemala: Universidad de San Carlos de Guatemala. (1979) (in Spanish)
- Joven narrativa guatemalteca Guatemala: Editorial Rin 78, primera edición. (1980) (in Spanish)
  - Joven narrativa guatemalteca Guatemala: Ministerio de Cultura y Deportes, 2nd edition, (1990) (in Spanish)
- Alfredo Gálvez Suarez: exposición, homenaje Guatemala: Fundación PAIZ Guatemala (1992) (in Spanish)
- Letras de Guatemala Guatemala: Fundación Paiz para la Cultura. (1993) (in Spanish)
- Cardoza y Aragón: líneas para un perfil Guatemala: Ministerio de Cultura y Deportes. (1994) (in Spanish)
- Mujeres que cuentan (co-written with Aida Toledo) Guatemala: Universidad Rafael Landívar. (2000) (in Spanish)
- Maladrón, doble ultraje al paraíso Guatemala-México: Fondo de Cultura Económica. (2001) (in Spanish)
- Archivos para teatro de Miguel Asturias (coordinadora de la colección). París: Colección Archivos/UNESCO. (2001) (in Spanish)
- Arte naïf : pintura maya guatemalteca contemporánea Guatemala: Fundación Paiz para la Educación y la Cultura. (2001) (in Spanish)
- Memorie controcorrente : El Río, novelas de caballería di Luis Cardoza y Aragón. Rome: Bulzoni. (2001) (in Italian)
- Cien años de magia: ensayos críticos sobre la obra de Miguel Angel Asturias (co-written with Oralia Preble-Niemi) Guatemala: F & G Editores (2006) (in Spanish)
- El hilo del discurso Guatemala: Universidad Rafael Landívar (2007) (in Spanish)
- Cara parens : ensayos sobre Rusticatio Mexicana Guatemala: Universidad Rafael Landívar (2009) (in Spanish)
