= Meneo =

Guatemalan musicologist, performer and presenter

MENEO
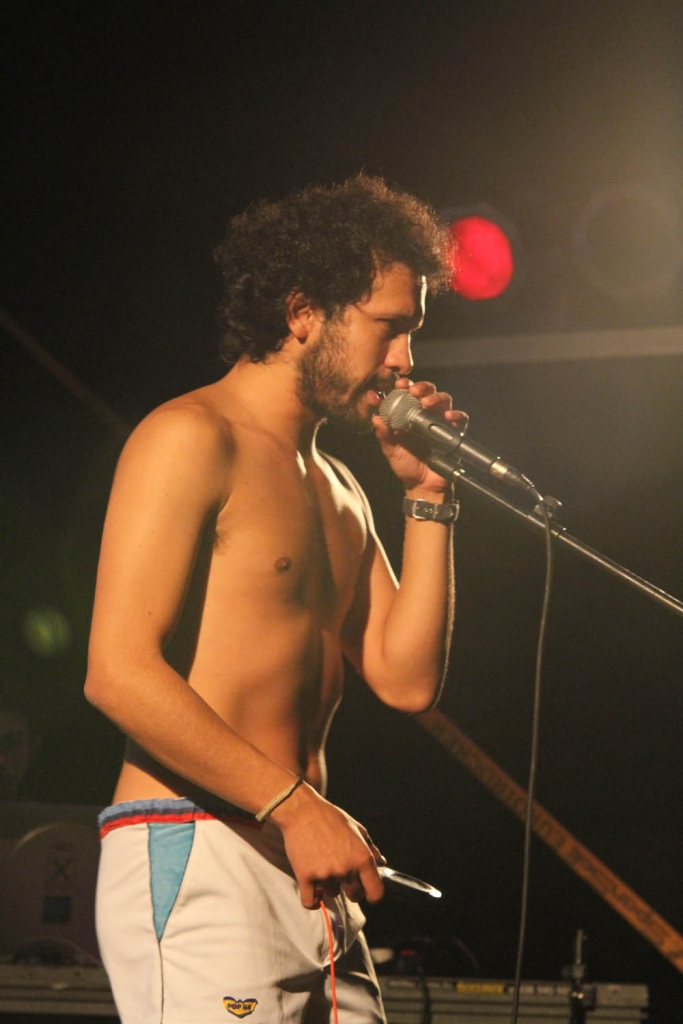
- Born: Guatemala
- Occupations: artist and producer
- Years active: 2007–present
- Website: Official Site

Rigo Pex, better known as MENEO, is a musicologist, performer and presenter from Guatemala. He coined the term "electropical" and is part of the first wave of global producers who mix electronic synths with traditional Latin rhythms like cumbia, merengue and dembow.

== In Guatemala ==
Before his solo career, Meneo was lead singer of the tropical hardcore band "Pealcubo" (1998-2000) and then of the cumbiaton quartet "Chichicua" (2002 to 2004). During this period, he studied musicology at the Universidad del Valle de Guatemala, where he started the Democracia Sonora project: a collection of recordings and samples of folk voices of the city, re-interpreted by producers such as Básico3, Francis Davila and Leo Carro. This work made him winner of the Bancafé Young Creator Award 2002. Afterwards, he becomes a cultural promoter with Tripiarte, an event that brings together more than 30 emerging artists of the time (Regina José Galindo, Javier Payeras Anibal Lopez, etc.), who showed an open discontent with artistic tendencies that were politically committed during the internal armed conflict in Guatemala. He is also a founding partner of La Rave del Castillo, the first electronic festival with more editions and attendees of the first decade of the 21st century.

== In Spain ==
After moving to Spain in the year 2006, he co-founded the "microBCN" chiptune music collective . in the city of Barcelona. After producing several events for this collective, MENEO becomes partner of the artist pixel art Entter, who made a visual spectacle with a high degree of interaction and nudity, hinting the influence La Fura dels Baus had left him after his job as booker at the Naumon cultural space. This experience leads them to play a tour with more than 70 gigs in 17 countries throughout Latin America and Europe, and in festivals such as Primavera Sound, Fusion Festival, Dour Festival, Blip Festival, Electric Picnic, Mystery Land, etc. Today, most tracks that are composed and performed with the Game Boy as an instrument are unpublished, as he considers the surprise factor a basic element in his show.

MENEO finally publishes three tracks for the first time in a compilation at the Fluid Ounce Records label in 2008, and makes the video QUIERO 'with the French puppet company Bootchinger's Boot. In 2009 publishes its first album on the independent Spanish label "Dress For Excess" under the title Santa Nalga , which was mastered by the team at Mad Decent. In the album, he combines tropical rhythmic elements from cumbia, bolero and reggaeton with the sound of drum machines, synthesizers and vocoders commonly used in the German electro and French house, anticipating the trend in years to come for global pop. Its song PAPI acquires certain success as a summer hit and becomes nominated for MTV's 2009 Video of the Year. From there he gets commissioned to remix artists such as Dover (band), Russian Red and The Zombie Kids. He becomes associated with producers that created dance genres such as tropical bass, moombahton, digital cumbia and electropical, a style MENEO coined to define his sound, which uses its own voice rather than folk samples along the new blended tracks.

In 2012 he moved to Madrid and gets signed by Subterfuge Records. He also presents for the first time in Casa de América the musical dissertation "Analogy Between Personal Maturity and Global Musical Trends", which he also presented at the Cultural Center of Spain in Montevideo. His EP entitled Larele ranked as one of the best of 2012 for sites like playgroundmag.net while the respective video was hailed as Spain's # 1 for notodo.com. At the end of the year, he publishes "Toda Loca", the first Spanish EDM track, which appeared in advertising for Cuore (magazine). It was officially remixed by the Mexican producer Toy Selectah.

In 2013 MENEO launches a 3 track EP under the name of El Jardín, whose eponymous single is recorded live in trio format for the music video platform VEVO. In 2015 he starts as the radio producer for LATINATOR, a weekly podcast on Spanish national Radio 3 (Spanish radio station), dedicated to showcasing labels with artists from the global bass scene. The increase musical archives led him to play in diverse parties such as the opening of ARCO '15, the takeover of the Madrid Mayor Manuela Carmena, Pride Day at Puerta de Alcalá, the opening of the GetxoPhoto Festival and the Lanzarote Bienal. In June, he debuted his new ep at the Sónar (festival), titled ago: "...& Tu Banda Ancha". In 2016, he performed at South by Southwest Festival in Austin Texas. His hits "Toda Loca" and "Su Su Suave" are licensed as the official song of MTV's Super Shore reality show, transmitted in Latin America, Brazil and other countries of the Mediterranean.

In 2019, he was selected by Officer & Gentleman, a Spanish awarded advertising agency, as the official DJ for their 2019 Summer Party in Colmenarejo (Madrid). In 2020 he starred in the documentary "The Mystery Of The Pink Flamingo", directed by Javi Polo and produced by Japonica Films; in it he interviews John Waters, Allee Willis, Eduardo Casanova and other artists; it's described by film critic Alfonso Rivera: "it's simultaneously a road movie, a firecracker comedy, a TV documentary, a crazy thriller, a self-help book and a personal shopper".

== Lost footage ==
MENEO was booked as part of Latin Americas's first Boiler Room (music project), a streaming event that featured other artists such as Daniel Maloso, Sietecatorce and Teen Flirt. The live show boiled to a point where several attendees went nude and the audiovisual session was taken down from the servers. MENEO was also the first person interviewed by Playground Mag, but the footage has never seen the light.

== Discography ==
=== Albums ===
- Santa Nalga (2009, Dress For Excess)

=== EPs ===
- Fluid Ounce Presents: (2008, Fluid Ounce Records)
- Larele (2012, Subterfuge)
- Toda Loca (2013, Subterfuge)
- El Jardín (2014, Subterfuge)
- Y Su Banda Ancha (2015, Subterfuge)
