= Carlos Navarrete Cáceres =

Guatemalan anthropologist and writer

Carlos Alberto Navarrete Cáceres (born January 29, 1931, in Quetzaltenango, Guatemala) is an anthropologist and writer. He studied history and literature at the Universidad de San Carlos de Guatemala and received his doctorate in anthropology from the National Autonomous University of Mexico. He is the author of books on anthropology and the 2002 collection of annotated essays entitled Luis Cardoza y Aragón y el Grupo Saker-Ti, that deals with the work of Luis Cardoza y Aragón and his participation in a round table organized by the Grupo Saker-Ti.

Carlos Navarrete Cáceres was awarded the 2005 Guatemala National Prize in Literature for his body of writings.

== Published works ==
- "Esquipulas en la poesía popular". El Imparcial, Diario Independiente. 21 October 1961.
- Un Reconocimiento de la Sierra Madre de Chiapas : apuntes de un diario de campo. México: UNAM. 1978.
- Las Esculturas de Chaculá, Huehuetenango, Guatemala. México: UNAM. 1979. ISBN 968-5826-03-X.
- Las rutas de comunicación prehispánica en los Altos Chuchumatanes: un proyecto arqueológico ethnohistórico. Antropología e Historia de Guatemala: Epoca 2, v.2. Guatemala: Dirección General de Antropología e Historia de Guatemala. 1980.
- Relatos mayas de tierras altas sobre el origen del maiz : los caminos de Paxil. México: UNAM. 2002. ISBN 970-32-0528-3.
- "El señor de Esquipulas: origen y difusión". Estudios, Revista de Antropología. 3ª época (Agosto). Escuela de Historia, IIHAA, USAC Guatemala. 1999.
- Los Arrieros del agua. Guatemala: Magna Terra. 2005. ISBN 99922-0-151-7.
- Las Rimas del peregrino : poesía popular en oraciones, alabados y novenas al Cristo de Esquipulas. México: Instituto de Investigaciones Antropológicas, UNAM. 2006.
- "Esquipulas: Origen y difusión de un Cristo Negro en Mesoamérica" (PDF). X Congreso Centroamericano de Historia, UNAN-Managua, Nicaragua (12 al 15 de julio del 2010) Mesa de Historia Cultural y del Pensamiento. 2010. Archived from the original (PDF) on 2011-07-18.
