= Academia Guatemalteca de la Lengua =

The Academia Guatemalteca de la Lengua (Spanish for Guatemalan Academy of the Language) is an association of academics and experts on the use of the Spanish language in Guatemala. It was founded on June 30, 1887. It is a member of the Association of Spanish Language Academies.

== Current members ==
- Margarita Carrera Molina
- Gustavo Adolfo Wyld Ferraté
- Mario Alberto Carrera Galindo
- Julia Guillermina Herrera Peña
- Francisco Pérez de Antón
- Rigoberto Juárez-Paz
- Ana M.ª Urruela de Quezada
- Mario Antonio Sandoval Samayoa
- Carmen Matute
- Lucrecia Méndez de Penedo
- Francisco Morales Santos
- Delia Quiñónez Castillo
- Gonzalo de Villa y Vásquez
- Dieter Hasso Lehnhoff Temme
- Mario Roberto Morales Álvarez
- María Raquel Montenegro Muñoz
- José Oswaldo Salazar de León
- Julio Roberto Palomo Silva
- Gustavo Adolfo García Fong
- María del Rosario Molina
- Gloria Hernández
- Luis Aceituno (elect)
