= Mario Monteforte Toledo =

Guatemalan writer, dramatist, and politician (1911–2003)

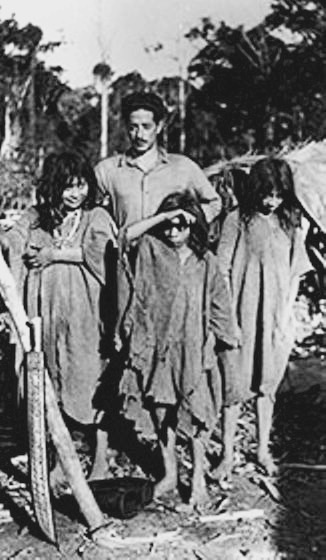
- Mario Monteforte Toledo with some Lacandon girls in 1938.

1st. Vice President of Guatemala
- In office March 15, 1948 – March 15, 1949
- President: Juan José Arévalo
- Preceded by: Position established Federico Ponce (as First Vice President)
- Succeeded by: Position abolished Clemente Marroquín (as Vice President of Guatemala, position reinstated in 1966)

Personal details
- Born: 11 September 1911 Guatemala City,
- Died: 4 September 2003 (aged 91) Guatemala City
- Party: Revolutionary Action Party

Mario Monteforte Toledo (September 15, 1911 – September 4, 2003) was a Guatemalan writer, dramatist, and politician. Born in Guatemala City, he played important roles in the governments of both Juan José Arévalo and Jacobo Arbenz, including periods as Ambassador to the United Nations between 1946 and 1947, as a deputy in the National Congress from 1947 to 1951, and being both President of the Congress and Vice-President between 1948 and 1949 before retiring from politics in 1951. With the fall of the Arbenz administration in 1954, Monteforte went into exile in Mexico until 1987.

A master of narrative prose, in 1993, Mario Monteforte was awarded the Guatemala National Prize in Literature for his body of work. He died of heart disease in Guatemala City.

== Published work ==
=== Novels ===
- Anaité (1948)
- Entre la piedra y la cruz (1948)
- Donde acaban los caminos (1952)
- Una manera de morir (1958)
- Llegaron del mar (1966)
- Los desencontrados (1977)
- Unas vísperas muy largas (1996)
- Los adoradores de la muerte (2000)

=== Short stories ===
- La cueva sin quietud (1949)
- Cuentos de derrota y esperanza (1962)
- Casi todos los cuentos (anthology) (1982
- Pascualito (children's story) (1991)
- La isla de las navajas (1993)
- Cuentos de la Biblia (2001)

=== Essays ===
- Guatemala. Monografía sociológica (1959–1965)
- Las piedras vivas (1965)
- Centroamérica, subdesarrollo y dependencia (1973)
- Mirada sobre Latinoamérica (1975)
- Literatura, ideología y lenguaje (1983)
- Los signos del hombre (1984)
- Las formas y los días - El barroco en Guatemala (1989)
- Palabras del retorno (1992).
