= Beatriz Caso =

Mexican artist (1929–2006)

Beatriz Caso Lombardo (May 25, 1929 – March 30, 2006) was a Mexican sculptor, whose works were recognized with membership in the Salón de la Plástica Mexicana.

Caso was born in Mexico City to archeologists Alfonso Caso and María Lombardo, who discovered Tomb 7 of Monte Albán in 1932. Her parents’ profession exposed her early to pre-Columbian art, especially that of the Zapotecs.

She attended the National Autonomous University of Mexico and later the Academy of Fine Arts in Paris, working in ceramics. She married playwright Carlos Solórzano and while traveling with him, became influenced by contemporary European sculpture.

She created monumental sculptures such as images of Alfonso Caso, María Lombardo, Rosario Castellanos, Benito Juárez and Sor Juana Inés de la Cruz both in Mexico and for Mexican diplomatic sites outside the country. All of the heads of her sculptures are inlaid with precious or semi-precious stone in the eyes as she believed that the eyes were for being, rather than simply for seeing.

She had two individual exhibitions at the Salón de la Plástica Mexicana in 1969 and 1975, of which she is a member and participated in various collective shows at the Palacio de Bellas Artes, the Museo de Arte Moderno and the Merkus and Misrachi galleries.
