= El Crucificado =

Stage Play

El Crucificado ("The Crucified One") is a 1957 play in three acts by the Guatemalan playwright Carlos Solórzano. It describes the events of Good Friday but sets them in modern times. The work is a tragic farce and is one of Solorzano's ten theatrical works.

== Dramatis personae ==
- Jesus: Man of approximately 30 years, with Latin American features.
- Maria: Mother of Jesus, old woman of the town.
- Magdalena: Woman of the town.
- Priest
- Four apostles: Men of the town who represent Juan (John the Apostle), Pedro (Saint Peter), Mateo (Saint Matthew) and Marcos (Saint Mark).
- Men and women of the town.

== Synopsis ==
The play is set in a completely ordinary town where the Passion of Christ will take place. A man named Jesus will encounter conflicts in the same manner as the Son of God.
