= Otto-Raúl González =

Guatemalan writer and lawyer

- Born: Otto-Raúl González Coronado; 1 January 1921; Guatemala City, Guatemala
- Died: 23 June 2007 (aged 86); Mexico City, Mexico
- Education: National Autonomous University of Mexico
- Occupations: Writer; poet; lawyer
- Awards: Miguel Ángel Asturias National Prize in Literature, 1990

Otto-Raúl González (1921–2007) was a Guatemalan writer, poet, and lawyer.

== Biography ==
Otto-Raúl González was born in Guatemala on 1 January 1921. As a young man he became active in student opposition to the dictatorship of Jorge Ubico and, with Carlos Illescas, Augusto Monterroso and other student colleagues, helped found Revista Acento.

After arriving in Mexico, González received support from Alfonso Reyes, who wrote a letter to the rector of the National Autonomous University of Mexico that helped him obtain a scholarship.

A longtime communist ideologue, during the social revolution of the administration of Jacobo Arbenz he was appointed undersecretary of the land reform program. González welcomed Che Guevara to Guatemala and gave him a government job. However, he had to flee his country following the 1954 overthrow of the government and for two years lived in Ecuador then went to Mexico.

González obtained a law degree from the National Autonomous University of Mexico.

Many decades later, he was allowed back to Guatemala by President Vinicio Cerezo. During his lifetime, González published more than 60 books with a number translated to several different languages. He was awarded the Premio Nacional de Poesía Jaime Sabines from Mexico and the 1990 Guatemala National Prize in Literature.

A book of his poetry was published in English in 2016.

== General references ==
- Prensa Libre Interview with Otto-Raúl González (Spanish language)
- Note about Gonzalez death (La Joranada, Spanish language)
