= Juana de la Concepción =

Guatemalan nun, writer, and poet

Sister Juana de la Concepción
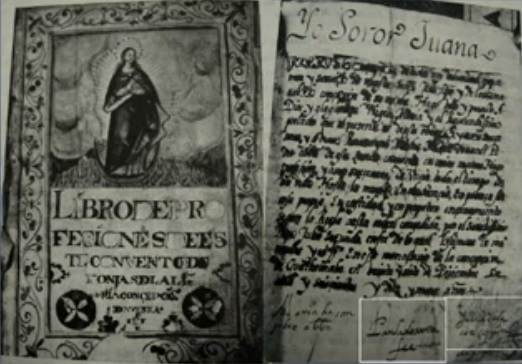
- Cover and page of the confession of Sister Juana in the Book of Professions of Novices of the Order of the Immaculate Conception of Antigua Guatemala
- Born: Juana de Maldonado y Paz; 1598 Santiago de los Caballeros de Guatemala, Captaincy General of Guatemala
- Died: 1666 (aged 67–68) Santiago de los Caballeros de Guatemala, Captaincy General of Guatemala
- Occupation: Nun, poet, writer

Sister Juana de la Concepción (born Juana de Maldonado y Paz in 1598 in Santiago de Guatemala; died 1666 in Santiago de Guatemala) was a Guatemalan nun, writer, and poet.

She is considered one of the most interesting and controversial figures in Santiago de Guatemala (then the capital of the Captaincy General of Guatemala) during the first half of the 17th century. She enjoyed fame as a poet at the beginning of the 17th century, according to friar and English traveler Thomas Gage (1597-1656).

Sister Juana took her vows as a nun in 1619 and lived until 1666 in the Convent of the Conception in Santiago de Guatemala. She was reputed to be an excellent musician, poet, and writer. She is sometimes compared to the Mexican poet Juana Inés de la Cruz.

== Biography ==
The life of Juana de la Concepción is known mainly through the writings of the English Dominican friar Thomas Gage (1602-1656).

=== Early life ===
Sister Juana was born Juana de Maldonado y Paz in 1598 in Santiago de los Caballeros de Guatemala. She was the only daughter of Juan de Maldonado y Paz, who was an oidor (judge) of the Real Audiencia, and Concepción de Quintanilla; she had one brother named Diego. Her mother died when she was very young. De Maldonado's education surpassed the typical for women of this era.

De Maldonado's early life was shaped by a controversy over a portrait of her and her family. Between 1611 and 1613, the Guatemalan painter Francisco Montúfar painted her as Saint Lucia, together with her father as Saint John the Baptist and her cousin Pedro Pardo as Saint Stephen. The painting was planted in altars and carried in processions. This generated a scandal in the city. In 1615, Rodrigo de Villegas (the canon of the Antigua Cathedral of Guatemala and representative of the Santo Oficio in Guatemala) reported them to Felipe Ruiz del Corral, the commissioner of the Spanish Inquisition in Mexico, as having committed a sacrilege. He alleged that de Maldonado was of illegitimate birth, and that it was improper for her to be depicted as a saint. De Maldonado's father showed the Inquisition tribunal that the complaint was motivated by a desire for personal revenge, given that he had previously reported Villegas and sent him to prison. (Note: The complaint was registered in the archives of the Inquisition and was the first reliable evidence of Sister Juana's historicity when it was discovered in 1948.)

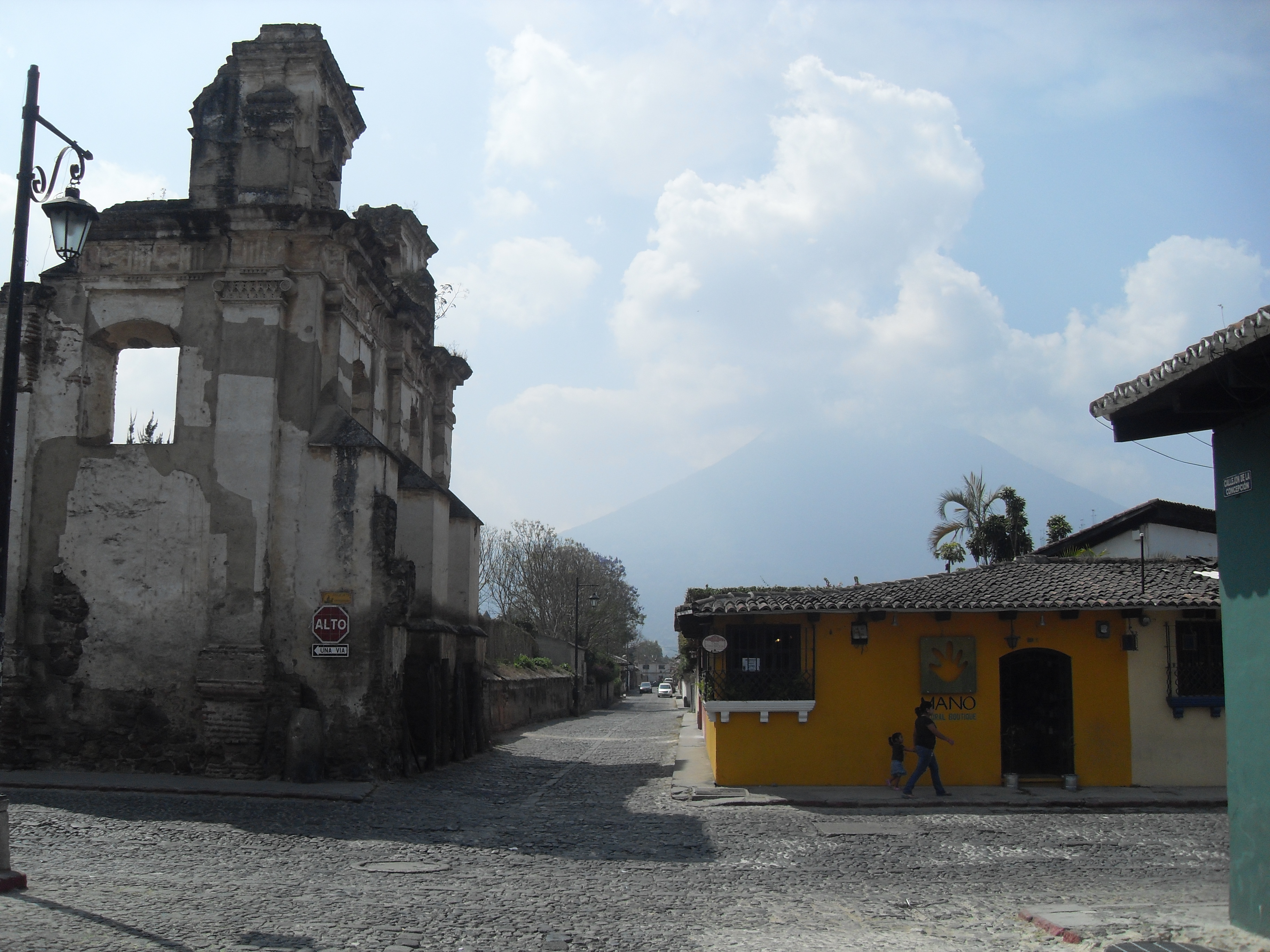
The Convent of the Conception, in Antigua Guatemala. It was destroyed by the Earthquake of Santa Marta in 1773; the Volcán de Agua is visible behind its ruins.

=== Entry into the Monastery of the Immaculate Conception ===
De Maldonado decided to seclude herself in a convent and to become a nun, which allowed her to devote herself fully to artistic and intellectual activities. She entered as a novice in the Monastery of the Immaculate Conception of Mary (Monasterio de la Inmaculada Concepción de María) ― today known as the Convent of the Conception (Convento de la Concepción) ― in Santiago de los Caballeros. She took her vows there on December 27, 1619, taking the name Sister Juana de la Concepción. She did not pay a dowry upon entering the monastery, as was typical at the time, possibly because her services as a musician were used to exempt her from payment.

The convent of the Order of the Immaculate Conception was the first institution for religious women in Guatemala, founded in 1578 by an abbot and three nuns from the convent of Mexico. For thirty years, it was the only female monastery in the region.

According to chronicler Thomas Gage, who visited Santiago many years later, the church of the convent ― situated today in the exit of Antigua Guatemala ― had a valuable collection of art. During this period, around 1,000 women lived in the convent, including nuns, novices, maids, and slaves. The father of Sister Juana built her living quarters inside the convent that were known for their opulence; the blueprint has survived.

In the 17th century there were two types of nuns: discalced (descalza) and urban (urbanista); Sister Juana was an urban nun.

Attribute	Discalced nuns	Urban nuns
Denomination	Recoletas Or of common life.	Shod or of particular life.
Cost of entry	None	Dowry or property that produces income for the monastery
Type of life	Cloistered	Cloistered
Prayer	In the chorus.	In the chorus.
Rule of austerity	Strict: they depended on the alms, maintained silence at all times except to pray, and never consumed chocolate. (Note: Chocolate was the preferred drink in Guatemala during the colonial era.)	Relaxed: they could have income and drink chocolate, except during fasts.
Rooms	Life in common in rooms of recreation of works. They possessed a celca tiny that only served them to sleep.	Without life in common. They lived in a big cell that was practically a house of reduced dimensions.
Eating habits	They ate meals in silence in refectories. They could not eat meat.	They prepared their own foods. They could eat meat except during fasts.
Service	They made the works, or served of the community service of the congregation	They could have personal servants.
Clothes	Austere clothes made of rustic fibers.	Fine clothing; they often wore jewelry.
Shod	Simple sandals	Shoes
Special attributes	None.	Teachers of girls placed in the care of the convent

Sister Juana's quarters were always full of poets, painters and writers, who were attracted by her beauty and fascinating personality. She is reputed to have had the best collection of musical instruments in the city, a complete library, and a lavish private chapel. Her life of art and erudición was known throughout Santiago. The Guatemalan writer Máximo Soto Hall, in his 1938 biographical novel about Sister Juana, called her "The Divine Recluse". The most distinguished figures of the city, including the bishop friar Juan de Zapata y Sandoval, gathered in her quarters for musical and literary entertainment. In the 18th century, a small baroque palace was constructed over Sister Juana's house within the convent; this palace was restored in the 21st century.

Sister Juana's father was called to serve the Spanish Crown in Mexico, leaving his daughter in Guatemala in 1636. During this period, Sister Juana experienced economic hardship; she could not pay the dowry to the convent and did not have money to pay for candles for her living quarters and sacristy. After efforts by her father and based on the merits of both her and her father, the Crown decided to award her an annual pension of 500 tostones (silver coins) to cover her expenses. (Note: A tostón was worth between two and four pesos; her expenses included pay for her servants and money for the maintenance of her morisca slaves.)

Thomas Gage reported in 1648 that Juan de Zapata y Sandoval, one of Sister Juana's admirers, appointed her as the convent's abbess ― passing over nuns of greater merit and age ― and that this caused a scandal in the convent. However, there is no reliable documentation of this supposed occurrence. The evidence indicates that the 1632 appointment of another nun, Sister Juana de la Trinidad, as abbess was canceled by then-bishop Agustín Ugarte y Savaria, who arrived in Guatemala that year, on the grounds that it had not been properly documented by the convent. There is also one document showing Sister Juana's status as an abbess as of 1665.

As an abbess, Sister Juana was responsible for reporting the convent's activities periodically to the bishop, and for requesting permissions from the bishop.

=== Illness and death ===
At the beginning of 1665, before being appointed abbess, Sister Juana fell ill and requested permission to sell a slave belonging to her to pay costs she had incurred. Similarly, she pawned a diamond in 1667 to pay money she owed to the convent.

Despite conflicting reports about the year of Sister Juana's death, the most recent research places her death in 1666. In late 1668, the convent's new abbes wrote to the bishop to inform him of the sale of the quarters that had been the property of Sister Juana's father; the sale was motivated by the need to pay Sister Juana's debts left after her death.

== Historicity ==
Until 1948, it was believed that Sister Juana was an invention of Thomas Gage, but her historicity was confirmed when historian Ernesto Chinchilla Aguilar located the complaint relating to her appearance as Santa Lucía in an early oil painting. The oil painting itself is believed to have been conserved at least until the 1970s. In 1972, José Manuel Montúfar Aparicio, a member of the Guatemalan Academy of Geography and History, published the book Los pintores Montúfar en la Ciudad de Santiago de Guatemala en el siglo xvii (The Montúfar painters in the City of Santiago de Guatemala in the 17th century), which included a photograph of the canvas. However, the work was later cut into several parts by an unknown person, and sold in pieces to foreign collectors.

In addition, Luz Méndez de la Vega discovered a complete copy of a Christmas auto sacramental (a type of dramatic work) attributed to Sister Juana, titled Entretenimiento en Obsequio de la Guida a Egicto. (Note: An "entretenimiento" is a light work whose purpose is solely to entertain.) This work has been studied because its characters include not only the Virgin Mary but importantly an indigenous man and woman as it is set in Guatemala. The play has been used to try and understand the roles of indigenous people at that time. Research in 2014 indicated that this work was not original to Sister Juana but rather was a musical work that had been commissioned for the convent.

More recently, in 2014 Coralia Anchisi de Rodríguez, a researcher at Francisco Marroquín University has done further research into the historical existence of Sister Juana of Maldonado.

== Works attributed to Sister Juana ==
Because of their vow of humility, 17th-century nuns were not allowed to write on non-theological subjects. Sister Juana did write certain reports to the bishop as abbess describing life in the convent, but these lack literary significance.

The first modern reference to Sister Juana's writings is found in Víctor Miguel Díaz's 1930 Historia de la imprenta en Guatemala, in which Díaz states that Sister Juana wrote El ángel de los forasteros at the request of priests who asked her to record her impressions of life in the convent. Two other Guatemalan historians, Ricardo Toledo Paloma and Mariano López Mayorical, brought to light 17th-century documents demonstrating her existence and presented writings attributed to her. Among the works that Mayorical attributes to Sister Juana are the following poems:

- Letra con estribillo a la Inmaculada Concepción
- A los santos reyes
- Al divino esposo
- Para las despedidas
- Versos para la pascua
- Para el Día de los Inocentes
- Oda a San Antonio

== Sister Juana in literature ==
Sister Juana has appeared as a character in several literary works, including the novels La divina reclusa (The divine recluse) by Máximo Soto Hall (1938) and The Nazarenos by José Mile and Vidaurre (1867). She also appears in a chapter of Memorias de fuego, I: Los nacimientos (1982) by Eduardo Galeano.

== Works cited ==
- Anchisi de Rodríguez, Coralia (February 13, 2014). "Sor Juana de Maldonado; reescribiendo su historia" (in Spanish). Universidad Francisco Marroquín.
- Chinchilla Aguilar, Ernesto (1965). Historia del arte en Guatemala: Arquitectura, pintura y escultura. Guatemala: Ministerio de Educación. OCLC 10017156.
- Chinchilla Aguilar, Ernesto (1948). Sor Juana de Maldonado y Paz: pruebas documentales de su existencia (in Spanish). Mexico: Hispanoamérica.
- Díaz, Víctor Miguel (1930). Historia de la imprenta en Guatemala; desde los tiempos de la colonia hasta la época actual (in Spanish). Guatemala: Tipografía Nacional.
- Gage, Thomas (1648). The English-American, his travail by Sea and Land, or A new survey of the West-Indias. London: R. Cotes.
- Galeano, Eduardo (1982). "Los nacimientos". Memorias de Fuego, I (in Spanish). Siglo XXI.
- López Mayorical, Mariano (1948). Estudio verificado sobre la discutida existencia de la monja Sor Juana de Maldonado y Paz (in Spanish). Guatemala: Centro Editorial.
- Luján Muñoz, Jorge (1990). "Chapter 4: El reino de Guatemala y su consolidación". Historia general de España y América (in Spanish). Vol. 9. Madrid, España: RIALP. ISBN 9788432121043.
- Méndez de la Vega, Luz (2002). La amada y perseguida Sor Juana de Maldonado & Paz (in Spanish). Guatemala: Universidad Rafael Landívar.
- Milla y Vidaurre, José (1867). Los nazarenos (in Spanish). Estudiantil Piedra Santa (2006 reprint). ISBN 99922-58-90-X.
- Rossi de Fiori, Iride, ed. (2006). Entretenimiento en obsequio de la Huida a Egipto (in Spanish). Salta, Argentina: Biblioteca de Textos Universitarios (Universidad Católica de Salta). ISBN 950-851-090-0.
- Soto Hall, Máximo (1938). La divina reclusa (in Spanish). Chile. ISBN 9789993960010.
- Torres, Miguel F. (July 8, 2009). "El retrato de Sor Juana". Prensa Libre.
