= Luis Alfredo Arango =

Luis Alfredo Arango (1936 in Totonicapán, Guatemala – 3 November 2001) was a poet. In 1988 he was awarded the Guatemala National Prize in Literature.

== Biography ==
Luis Alfredo Arango Enriquez is one of the most important poets in Guatemalan literature. He was born in 1935 in Totonicapán, located in the highlands of Guatemala situated 180 km from Guatemala City. The Arangos were part of the "ladino" circle of Totonicapán. They held important positions in the public administration and, while not rich, in relation to the Mayan population his family had more privileges than others. Luis Alfredo had access to elementary and high school studies. Arango, emigrated to the capital city to obtain the Teaching Certificate at Instituto Nacional Central para Varones. His first teaching experience was in San José Nacahuil, an indigenous town 20 km from the city. That experience changed his life. Nacahuil was a sample of the miserable conditions of the Guatemalan indigenous people. After a year of teaching, Arango witnessed death, illness, starvation, a long list of adversities the rural population experience.

Arango died on 3 November 2001.
