= Juana Pavón =

Honduran poet and actress (1945–2019)

- Born: Margarita Velásquez Pavón; July 19, 1945; San Marcos de Colón
- Died: March 28, 2019 (aged 73); Tegucigalpa
- Occupation: Poet

Juana Pavón (July 19, 1945 – March 28, 2019) was a Honduran poet and actress. She was noted for her feminist poetry and critique of Honduran society.

== Biography ==
Pavón was born in San Marcos de Colón in 1945. Her mother, who was 14 at the time of Pavóns birth, died during childbirth and her father died days later due to alcohol abuse. She was then adopted by a doctor from the maternity hospital but was soon moved to an orphanage after he left Honduras to live in exile.

She spent most of her childhood in boarding schools or orphanages where she faced frequent punishment for acts of rebellion. She developed a like of poetry at a young age and reported that her favourite poet growing up was Juana Inés de la Cruz.

In 1970, she moved to Tegucigalpa and changed her name legally to Margarita Velásquez Pavón. She fell pregnant but was abandoned by the child's father which left her destitute and she became a prostitute to earn money to be able to look after her child. In total, Pavón had three children who were adopted by different families.

During this period, while battling alcoholism and poverty, she started to write poetry under the pen name Juana Pavón and gained recognition through establishing friendships with individuals based at the National School of Fine Arts. In 1981, she published a collaboration poetry collection, Two Voice Verse, with Costa Rican poet Carmen Naranjo. In 1994 she published her first individual volume of poetry I am that subject. In 2002, she appeared in a Honduran film Anita, the Insect Hunter playing the part of Sister Margarita. In 2004, she published her second book, Exacta, which acts as an encyclopedia of her life told through poems and creative writing.

In 2016, she moved to the mining town of San Juancito, where it is reported she lived in poverty and poor health. She died on March 28, 2019, of advanced mouth cancer.
