= Antonio Flores (footballer, born 1972) =

Spanish footballer and manager

Personal information
- Full name: Antonio J Flores
- Date of birth: 7 March 1972 (age 54)
- Place of birth: Bendorf, Germany

Team information
- Current team: Hogar Hispano Valencia (technical director)

Youth career
- 1983–1989: La Mojonera CF

Senior career*
Years	Team	Apps	(Gls)
1989–1994	La Mojonera CF	105	(31)

Managerial career
- 2011–2012: EMF Roquetas (youth)
- 2012–2013: Roquetas (youth)
- 2013–2015: Polideportivo Aguadulce (youth)
- 2015: Villa SC
- 2016: Sarl Star Football Algérie (youth)
- 2017: Sandawana
- 2017: Lioli FC
- 2017–2018: Super Eagles FC
- 2018: Nyamityobora
- 2019: CD Roquetas (youth)
- 2019–2020: CD Dofer Dalias
- 2020–2021: Yaracuyanos
- 2022–: Hogar Hispano Valencia (technical director)
- * Club domestic league appearances and goals

Antonio J. Flores Flores (born 7 March 1972) is a Spanish football manager who serves as a technical director at Hogar hispano valencia fc of the liga estadal venezuela.

== Playing career ==
He played for La Mojonera FC in youth stage as well featured for the senior team of La Mojonera in 1989–1994.

== Managerial career ==
He has worked in the FIFA competition such as Uganda Super League, Lesotho Premier League, Futve Liga Venezuela, National First Division in South Africa. He managed clubs in Spain (youth), (2 andaluza), Villa SC, Nyamityobora fc in Uganda, Sandawana FC, Lioli FC both in Lesotho and lately Super Eagles FC in South Africa National First Division, and Yaracuyanos FC in Venezuela.

=== Villa SC ===
On 13 July 2015 was unveiled as the head coach of Villa SC by Villa SC boss Ben Misagga and penned a two-year contract but in November 2015 he parted ways with Villa SC and was linked to Gor Mahia FC but the deal failed on the eleventh hour.

=== Sarl Star Football Algérie (U-17) ===
In September 2016 he was signed as the coach for the U-17 to develop players for La Masia in Algeria.

=== Sandawana FC ===
In January 2017 he was a head coach in Lesotho Premier League club Sandawana FC and agreed a one-year deal with the club management. He worked with American coach Eric Sarno as his assistant. In his first match, he registered a 2–1 win over Linare FC on 12 February at Maputsoe DiFA Stadium. He saved it from the relegation successfully and in June 2017 he parted ways from it.

=== Lioli FC ===
In July 2017 he was appointed as the technical director coach for Lioli FC where he guided them through 23 games and making the best record of winning with 78%. In November 2017 he left the club leading the table of the Lesotho Premier League to join National First Division club in South Africa.

=== Super Eagles FC ===
In November 2017, he was appointed as the head coach in the National First Division Super Eagles Football club in South Africa replacing Tshegofatso Mashego, who was demoted following a poor start to the season that saw the team winning just two of their first 10 league matches. He guided them through 17 games where they won 2 games of Nedbank Cup games, winning to Black Leopards 3-0 and losing in extra time 2–1 against Free State Stars. In March 2018, he parted ways amicably.

=== Nyamityobora FC ===
He signed a contract on 28 August 2018 as the technical director at Nyamityobora FC.

=== CD Roquetas (U-17) ===
He signed contract as head coach with CD Roquetas (U-17) on 7 March 2019 till 30 June 2019.

=== CD Dofer Dalias ===
On 13 July 2019 he signed as head coach for the Spanish club CD Dofer Dalias.

=== Yaracuyanos F.C. ===
In March 2020, Flores was appointed as the technical director for Yaracuyanos F.C. in Venezuela Premier League.

== Personal life ==
Flores is a UEFA Pro Licence Coaching license holder. He holds a Spanish level 3 coaching football license, CAF B License. He speaks English, Spanish, German and Russian. Flores is a cousin to former Watford and now Espanyol manager Quique Sánchez Flores.
