= Sandawana FC =

- Full name: Sandawana Football Club
- Ground: St. Michaels Stadium, Maputsoe, Lesotho
- Capacity: 1,000
- League: Lesotho Premier League
- 2013–14: 10th

Sandawana Football Club is a Lesotho football club based in Mpharane. It is based in the city of Makheka, Thaba-Tseka District in the region Thaba-Tseka District.

The team currently plays in Lesotho Second Division.

In 2014 the club was renamed from Mpharane Celtics to Sandawana.

== Stadium ==
Currently the team plays at the 1,000 capacity St. Michaels Stadium.

== Performance in CAF competitions ==
- Lesotho Premier League: 2011–2013
- Lesotho Second Division: ????–2011, 2013–
