= Luis de Lión =

Guatemalan writer (1939–1984)

- Luis de Lión's entry in "Diario Militar" (Casa Museo Luis de Lión)
- Born: August 19, 1939; San Juan del Obispo, Sacatepéquez, Guatemala
- Died: June 6, 1984 (aged 44); Unknown
- Occupation: Teacher
- Writing career
- Genres: Novel, Short Story, Poetry
- Notable work: El tiempo principia en Xibalbá

Luis de Lión, born José Luis de León Díaz (August 19, 1939 – June 6, 1984) was a Guatemalan writer kidnapped on May 15, 1984, by elements of Guatemalan Army intelligence, and henceforth "disappeared". His posthumous novel, El tiempo principia en Xibalbá (Time Commences in Xibalbá) is considered an important work in modern Central American literature.

== Life and work ==
Born into a Kaqchikel Maya family, his father's work as a policeman during the rule of dictator Jorge Ubico enabled him to receive basic education. He completed his studies in Guatemala City, graduating with a teaching certification in primary education.

He worked as a teacher in various places in Guatemala until he was made a professor of literature at Universidad de San Carlos de Guatemala. As a leader of the communist Partido Guatemalteco del Trabajo ("Guatemalan Workers' Party"), he promoted universal access to quality education as a means to improve the quality of life of Guatemalan people. In San Juan del Obispo, the village near Antigua Guatemala where he was born, he founded a small library in which he taught literacy to his former neighbors.

On May 15, 1984, while he was driving to work in the Centro Histórico of Guatemala City, a group of armed plainclothes men forced him into an unmarked car. He joined the ranks of more than 30,000 citizens "disappeared" by the military rulers of Guatemala during the 1980s as part of the Guatemalan Civil War. Nothing was known of his fate until 1999, when his name appeared in Diario Militar, a document published in Harper's Magazine containing photographs and information on the capture and execution of 183 people, and in which he was listed as number 135. From this source, it became known that he had been killed on June 6, 1984, about three weeks after his abduction.

== Legacy ==
Luis de Lión's literary reputation was established with the posthumous publication of his only novel, El tiempo principia en Xibalbá in 1985, in which he relates a Mayan worldview in contemporary language.

La Casa Museo Luis de Lión in San Juan del Obispo preserves the author's work and exhibits his personal effects, including books and notes, as well as maintaining the library that he founded in 1962.

In 2005, the government of Guatemala under president Óscar Berger officially acknowledged responsibility for the death of Luis de Lión.

== Published works ==
- Los Zopilotes (cuentos) (Editorial Landivar, 1966)
- Su segunda muerte (cuentos) (Editorial Nuevo Siglo, 1970)
- Uno más uno (1974)
- Poemas del volcán de Agua (1980)
- Pájaro en mano. Certamen Permanente Centroamericano "15 de septiembre" (Editorial Serviprensa Centroamericana, 1985).
- El tiempo principia en Xibalbá (Editorial Serviprensa Centroamericana, 1985)
- La puerta del cielo y otras puertas (Editorial Artemis Edinter, 1998)
- Poemas del volcán de Fuego (Bancafé, 1998)
- Didáctica de la palabra (2002)
- Taller poesía (2002)
- El libro José (2002)
- Una experiencia poética (2007)
- Música de agua (2007)

== See also ==
- List of kidnappings
- Lists of solved missing person cases
