= Evelyn Ugalde =

Costa Rican journalist and writer

Evelyn Rocio Ugalde Barrantes
- Born: Evelyn Rocio Ugalde Barrantes; October 20, 1975 (age 50); San Joaquín de Flores, Heredia Province, Costa Rica
- Education: University of Costa Rica
- Occupations: Journalist, writer, editor, cultural promoter
- Known for: Co-founding Clubdelibros; producer, director and screenwriter of Semicolon
- Awards: Joaquín García Monge National Prize for Cultural Promotion (2009, 2013)

Evelyn Rocio Ugalde Barrantes (born 20 October 1975) is a journalist, writer, editor and cultural promoter of Costa Rica. She has received the Joaquín García Monge National Prize for cultural promotion twice for her work, first individually in 2009, and in 2013, along with the rest of the team, as the producer of the cultural program Semicolon.

== Biography ==
Ugalde was born in San Joaquín de Flores, Flores canton, Heredia province, Costa Rica, in October 1975. She attended primary and secondary school there, before studying communication at the University of Costa Rica. She has worked as a journalist in media like The Nation, The Free Press, Channel 7 (including on the program Blanco y Negro), and Central American Weekly. She has been producer, director and screenwriter of the literary program Semicolon of Channel 13, which began in 2008. In 2001, she co-founded literary magazine and website Clubdelibros with Manuel Delgado, in order to encourage reading. In 2012 she was voted Cultural Person of the Year by readers of the website Culturacr.net. The same year she also founded Publisher Clubdelibros specialising in literary fantasy and the promotion of literature.

== Literary career ==
Ugalde specialised in children's literature, with many of her works directed to children and to the promotion of reading.

She is co-author of the books A strategy for animating reading every day and 100 strategies for animating reading in high school. Her book When the tales grow was published in Costa Rica in six editions, and also in Colombia by Publishing Black Sheep, in Cuba by Publishing New People, in Peru by Publisher Malabares and in the Dominican Republic by Publishing Sanctuary. Her book The cuentasueños was published by Atabal (2006) in Costa Rica and by Izar Editions in Uruguay. In 2013, she published The world of imaginary friends.

She has also contributed stories to various anthologies: Unidentified Object and other tales of science fiction, Cobwebs, Costa Rican tales of terror, The end of the world: apocalyptic tales, Buajaja: tales of fear for brave children, Penumbras, and others.

== Bibliography ==
=== Collections of stories ===
- Cuando los cuentos crecen (When the tales grow) (Atabal, 2006)
- El mundo de los amigos imaginarios (The world of imaginary friends) (Clubdelibros, 2013)
- Los cuentos están locos (The tales are crazy) (Clubdelibros, 2014)

=== Novels ===
- El cuentasueños (The Dream Account) (Atabal, 2007)

=== Anthologies ===
Her stories have appeared in:

- 'El despertar de las leyendas' (The awakening of the legends), in the anthology Aquelarre.
- 'A Costa Rica nunca más' (Never more to Costa Rica), in the anthology POE 21st century
- 'Deja Vú', in the anthology Telarañas (Cobwebs)
- 'Amor virtual' (Virtual love), in the anthology Objeto no identificado (Unidentified Object)
- 'Contemos historias de miedo' (Let's tell scary stories), in the anthology Buajaja
- 'Yo quiero un cuento de susto' (I want a scary story), in the anthology Penumbras
- 'Huyendo del país de Nunca Jamás' (Escaping from Neverland), in the anthology Mi media cebolla (My half onion)

=== Cultural promotion ===
- Una estrategia de animación a la lectura para cada día (A strategy for animating reading every day) (coauthor with Kattia Muñoz, Clubdelibros 2006).
- 100 estrategias de animación a la lectura para secundaria (100 strategies for animating reading in high school) (Clubdelibros, 2012)
