= Dina Meza =

Honduran journalist

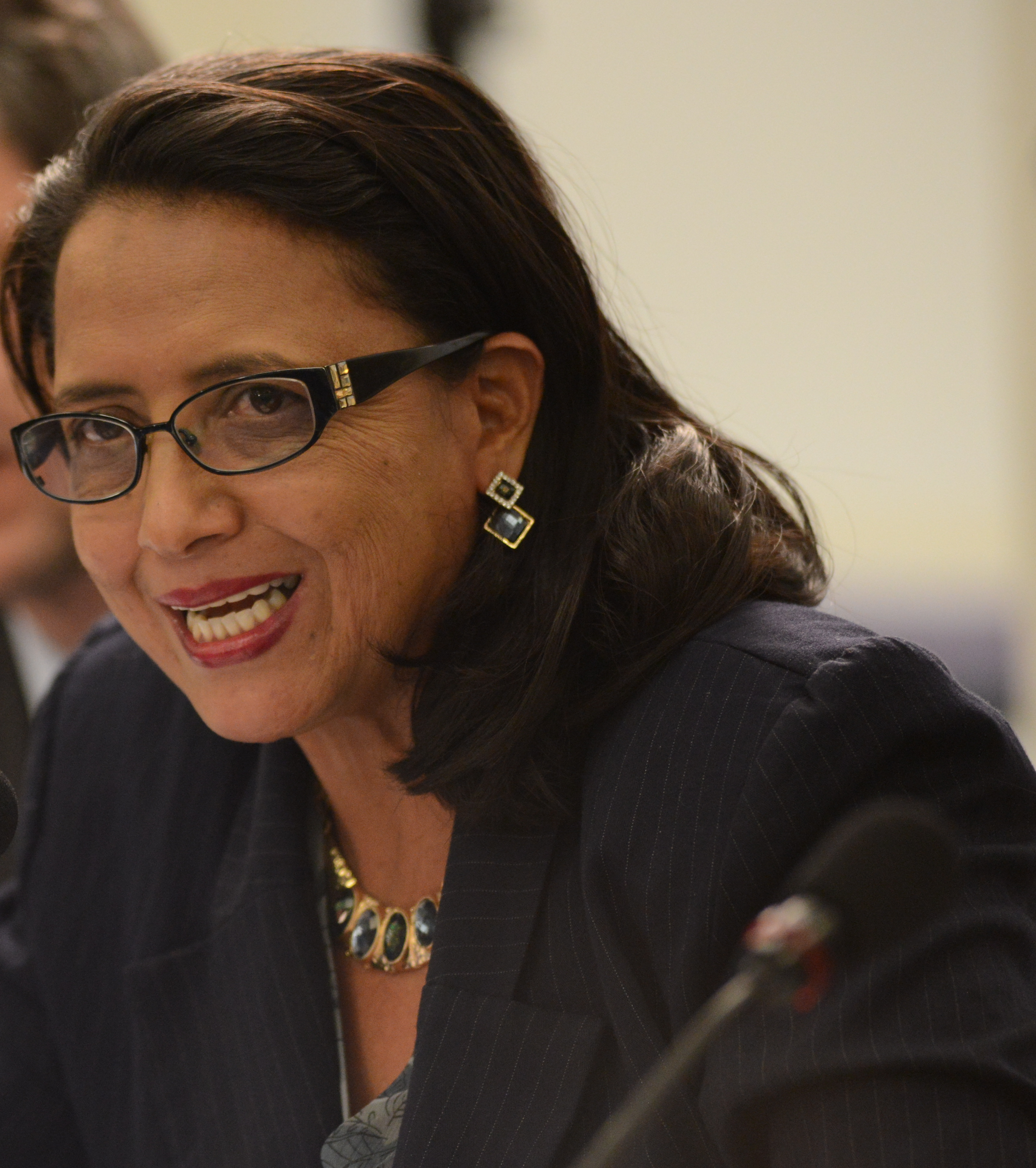
- Occupations: Journalist and Human Rights Defender
- Known for: Investigation of human rights abuses in Honduras
- Children: Three

Dina Meetabel Meza Elvir is a journalist, human rights defender, and founder of PEN Honduras, an organisation which supports at-risk journalists.

== Biography ==
Dina Meza was born in 1962 in Cofradía, Cortés Honduras.

== Work and activism ==
Meza's work focuses on the abuse and violation of human rights. In 1989, Meza's older brother was kidnapped and tortured by the military, and his experience motivated her to begin reporting on human rights abuses in Honduras. She also cites her three children as motivation for her continued work, despite its dangers.

Meza has worked as a journalist since 1992. She founded and edits Pasos de Animal Grande, an online-only newspaper which documents human rights abuses in Honduras, as a way to have her work more widely seen, and avoid the censorship of her work she encounters in her home country.

In 2012, she was a member of the Committee of Families of Detainees and Disappeared in Honduras (COFADEH). In 2016, Meza reported on the murder of Berta Caceres, an environmental activist.

She set up an organisation called Periodismo y Democracia – Journalism & Democracy with an aim to provide greater protection to journalists in Honduras and a safer way to share their work without censorship. She is the founder and current President of PEN Honduras, an organisation that supports journalists at risk.

Meza was named as one of Reporters Without Borders’ "100 Heroes and Heroines of Information" in 2014.

== Threats and abuse ==
The nature of Meza's work is such that she and her family have faced multiple threats of violence and instances of harassment, including explicit threats of sexual violence. In 2006, following investigations by her online magazine Revistazo into labour rights abuses carried out by private security companies in Horduras, Dionisio Diaz Garcia, a lawyer for the magazine, was shot and killed. In 2013, threats to her safety resulted in her spending five months in exile. Between January and October 2015, Meza reported that she was subject to 36 individual instances of threats to her security.

== Awards ==
In 2007, Meza received Amnesty International UK's special award for at-risk journalists. In 2014, she was awarded the Oxfam Novib/PEN International Freedom of Expression Award.
