= Makheka, Thaba-Tseka District =

Rapoleboea
- Community Council
- Geographic Center of Community
- Coordinates: 29°33′19″S 28°54′14″E
- Country: Lesotho
- District: Thaba-Tseka District
- Elevation: 7,231 ft (2,204 m)

Population (2006)
  - Total: 11,533
- Time zone: UTC+2 (CAT)
- Coordinates computed from Lesotho Villages file.

Rapoleboea is a community council located in the Thaba-Tseka District of Lesotho. Its population in 2006 was 11,533.

== Villages ==
The community of Rapoleboea includes the villages of Aupolasi, Bokhoasa, Ha Chakatsa, Ha Jakopo, Ha Joalane (Lekhalong), Ha Khatho, Ha Khoali, Ha Korotla Taung, Ha Kutoane, Ha Machokoloane, Ha Makoko, Ha Makunyapane, Ha Mapheele, Ha Mongali, Ha Mosehle, Ha Motsiba, Ha Nkune, Ha Qena, Ha Raletsoai, Ha Salemone, Ha Shoaepane, Ha Thokho, Ha Tjope, Laleng, Lekhalong, Lelibohong, Linakeng, Lithakong, Lulang, Maheising, Mahooeng, Majoe-Matšo, Makanyaneng, Malothoaneng, Maputsoe, Masokoaneng, Matlatseng, Matseng, Moriting, Motse-Mocha, Mpharane, Nqochane, Ntšupe, Phuleng, Pitsaneng, Pitseng, Sani Top, Sani Top (Sekiring), Sekhutloaneng, Seroala-Nkhoana, Taung, Terai Hoek, Thaba-Bosiu, Thaba-Ntšo (Ha Setai) and Tiping.
