= Carol Zardetto =

Guatemalan novelist (born 1959)

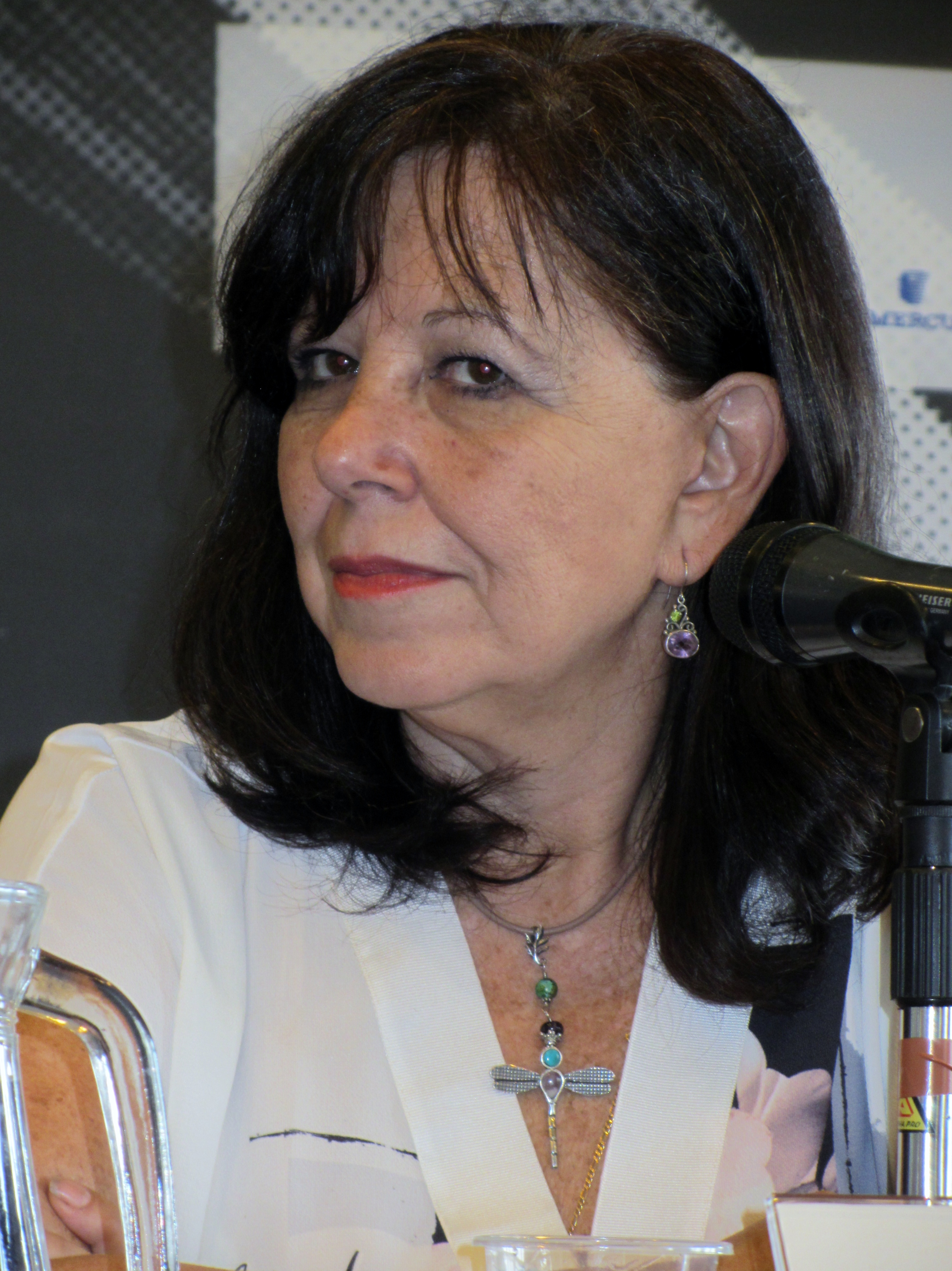
- Zardetto at the Santiago International Book Fair (2015)
- Born: 1959 (age 66–67); Guatemala City, Guatemala
- Education: Degree in law
- Occupations: Novelist; Lawyer; Screenwriter; Diplomat
- Notable work: With Absolute Passion; The Discourse of the Madman: Tales of the Tarot; The City of the Minotaurs
- Awards: Mario Monteforte Toledo Prize

Carol Zardetto (born 1959, Guatemala) is a Guatemalan novelist, lawyer, scriptwriter and diplomat, and is part of the generation of Guatemalan writers who grew up under the shadow of Guatemalan Civil War.

== Biography ==
She was born in Guatemala City, and has a degree in law. She was co-author of the theatre criticism column "Butaca de dos" (Seat for two; "Magazine XX", Siglo Veintiuno, 1994-1996). She published the novel "Con pasión absoluta" (With absolute passion) in 2007; it was awarded the Mario Monteforte Toledo prize in 2004.

Zardetto has been a columnist for El Periódico since 2007.

She was Guatemala's deputy minister of education in 1996, and from 1997 to 2000 she was consul general of Guatemala in Vancouver, Canada.,

== Works ==
With absolute passion, novel, F & G Editores, Guatemala, 2005, ISBN 978-9929-700-41-3

The discourse of the madman: tales of the Tarot, illustrated edition, F & G, Guatemala, 2009. ISBN 978-99939-951-0-4

The city of the minotaurs, novel, Alfaguara, 2016. ISBN 978-607-31-4456-8
