= Aida Toledo =

Guatemalan writer

Aida Toledo (born 1952) is a Guatemalan poet, short story writer, non-fiction writer and educator.

== Biography ==
Born in Guatemala City in 1952, Toledo studied literature at the San Carlos University. She then attended University of Pittsburgh where she obtained both a master's degree (1997) and a doctorate (2001) in Latin American literature and culture. She has taught abroad at the University of Alabama, the University of Toulouse II – Le Mirail and the University of Arizona and in Guatemala at Rafael Landívar University and at the Centro de Investigaciones Regionales de Mesoamérica (CIRMA).

One of Central America's most significant poets, Toledo's work exhibits an intimately sensual flavour of provocative feminism. In her Pezóculos (2001), the 14 short stories at the beginning of the book present female characters who suffer the kind of social pressures women so often experience. Then come 10 texts in poetic prose with philosophical reflections stemming from Toledo's academic background.

Aida Toledo is married to Enrique Noriega (born 1949), another award-winning poet from Guatemala.

== Works ==
Toledo's publications include academic works, poetry collections and fiction:

Academic works

- 1999: En la mansa oscuridad blanca de la cumbre, essays about the oeuvre of Miguel Ángel Asturias
- 2001: Vocación de herejes, reflections on contemporary Guatemalan literature
- 2004: Desde la zona abierta, critical articles on the work of Ana María Rodas
- 2008: Otra vez Gómez Carrillo

Poetry collections

- 1990: Brutal batalla de silencios (Brutal Battle of Silences)
- 1994: Realidad más extraña que el sueño (Reality Stranger Than Dream) with which she won the September 15th Central American Permanent Contest in 1992
- 1997: Cuando Pittsburgh no cesa de ser Pittsburgh
- 1998: Bondades de la cibernética/Kindness of Cybernetics
- 2006: Con la lengua pegada al paladar (Quetzaltenango Hispanic-American award in 2003)
- 2010: Un hoy que parece estatua

Short stories

- 2001: Pezóculos (an invented title combining "pezón", nipple and "monóculos", monocles)

== Awards ==
Toledo has received several literary awards including first prize at the 66th Hispanic-American Literature Competition at Quetzaltenango with her poetry collection Con la Lengua Pegada al Paladar (With the Tongue stuck to the Top of the Mouth).
