= Rafael Landívar =

Guatemalan poet and Jesuit priest

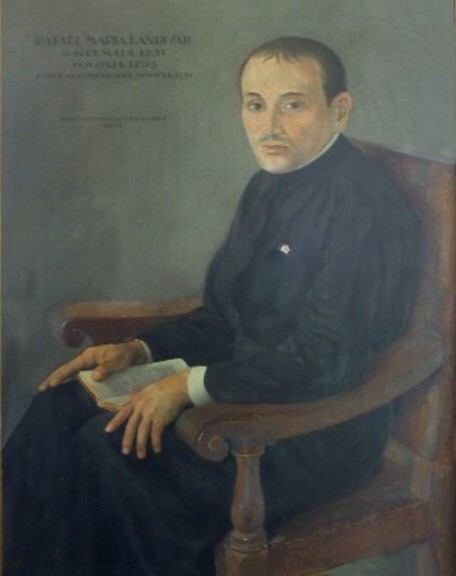
- Born: October 27, 1731; Antigua Guatemala, Santiago de los Caballeros de Guatemala, Capitanía General de Guatemala, Imperio español
- Died: September 27, 1793 (aged 61); Bologna, Italy
- Occupations: poet; monk
- Writing career
- Genre: Poetry
- Notable work: Rusticatio mexicana

Rafael Landívar, S.J. (Santiago de los Caballeros, Guatemala, Captaincy General of Guatemala, October 27, 1731 - Bologna, Italy, September 27, 1793) was a Guatemalan poet and Jesuit priest. He is considered among the important authors of the Spanish Universalist School of the 18th century.

== Early life ==
Landívar was born in Guatemala on October 27, 1731 in Santiago de los Caballeros de Guatemala, which is now known as Antigua to Pedro Landívar y Caballero a nobleman from Navarra and Doña Juana Xaviera Ruiz de Bustamante a criolla from El Panchoy in a house near the Church and convent of the Society of Jesus, in Antigua.^{[a]}

Rafael earned a Bachelor degree in philosophy in 1746 at the Colegio Mayor Universitario de San Borja. He read theology and earned a Master of Arts at Royal and Pontifical University of San Carlos Borromeo^{[b]}

== Landívar and the Jesuits ==
Emblem of the Jesuits.

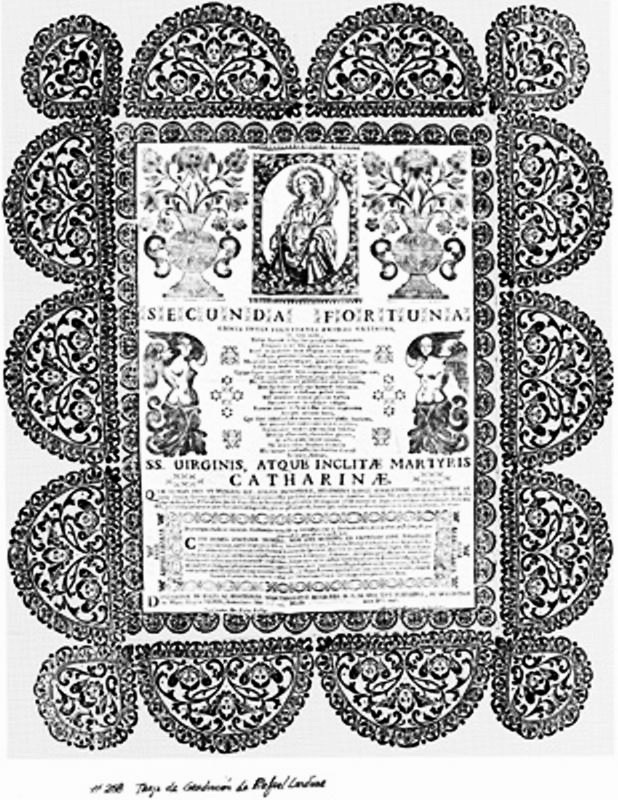
Graduation card from Colegio San Borja by Rafael Landívar. Printed by Blas de Ávila in 1746.

In 1750 Landívar entered the Jesuit seminary at Tepotzotlán in Mexico. He held various academic posts and was ordained in 1755. Upon his return to Guatemala in 1760 he taught at the Colegio San Borja and eventually served as Rector.

In 1765 he wrote a poem about the 1751 earthquakes in Santiago de los Caballeros which was published along with his Rusticatio Mexicana after the expulsion of the Jesuits from the Spanish possessions in 1767. In 1766 he delivered, in Latin, the funeral oration of the first archbishop of Guatemala, Francisco Pardo y Figueredo.

== Expulsion from Guatemala ==
On April 2, 1767, the Jesuits were expelled from the Spanish Empire. Landívar went first to Mexico and then to Europe, settling in Bologna. There he published his Latin book Rusticatio Mexicana ("Through the Fields of Mexico"). The work achieved such success in its first edition, published in Modena in 1781, that a second was published in 1782 in Bologna, consisting of 15 books and an appendix, with a total of 5,348 verses. Other notable works are A la capital de Guatemala ("To the Capital of Guatemala") and Pelea de gallos ("Cockfight").

== Death and burial ==
Landívar died on September 27, 1793 in Bologna, where he was buried in the church of Santa Maria delle Muratelle. In 1950 his remains were found and repatriated to Guatemala, where he was buried in a lavish mausoleum located in Antigua Guatemala.

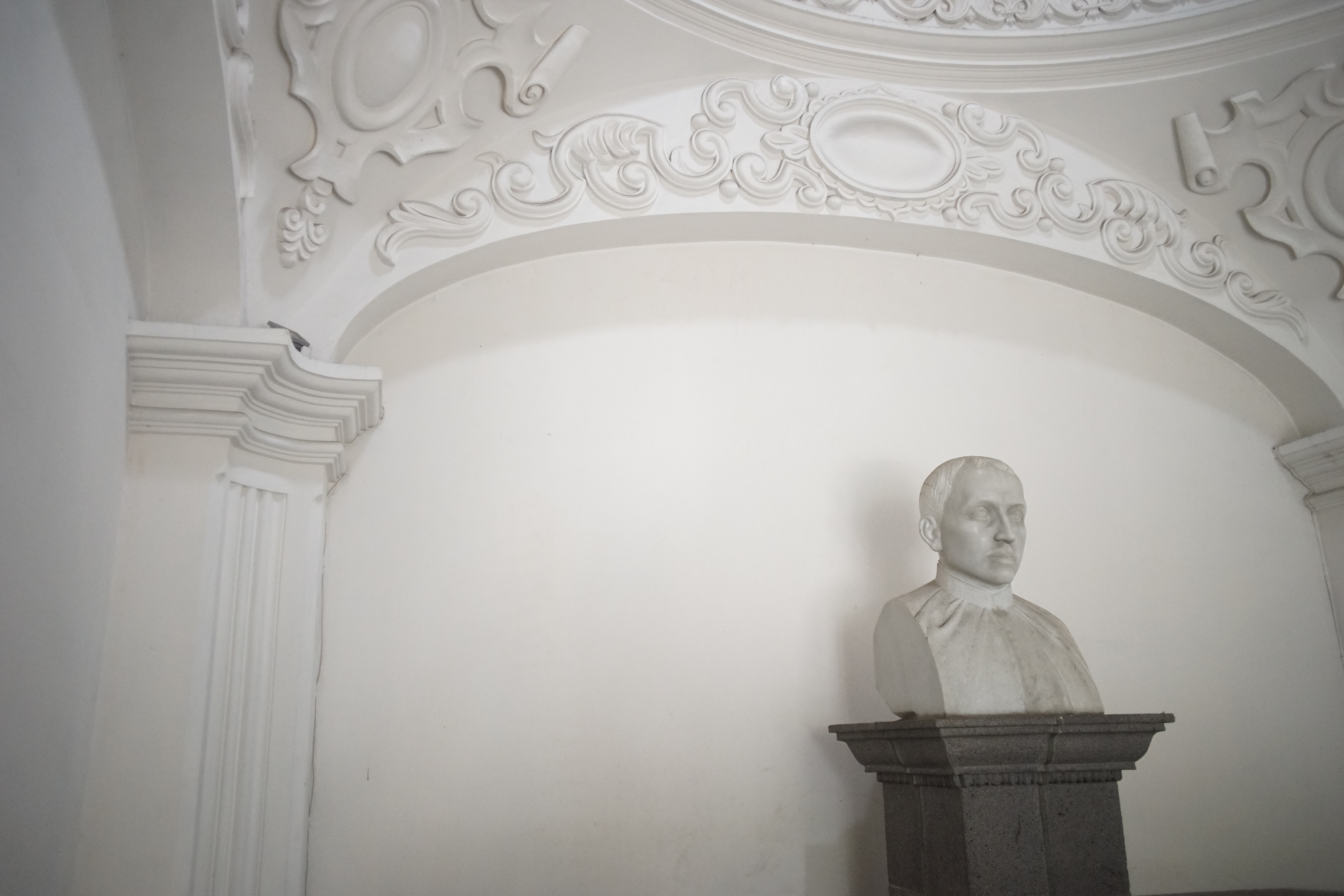
Tomb of Rafael Landívar in Antigua Guatemala

== Rediscovery in the 19th century ==
Emblem of the Rafael Landívar University

According to the historian Ramón A. Salazar, writing in 1897, editions of Rusticatio Mexicana were scarce and the work almost unknown in Guatemala. When Salazar was Minister of Foreign Affairs in the government of General José María Reina Barrios in 1893, he asked the Guatemalan consul in Venice to visit Bologna and find out everything he could about Landívar. Little was found, but the consul sent two copies of Rusticatio Mexicana, one of which was translated into Spanish by Dr. Antonio Ramírez Fontecha, who printed it in Madrid, in time to present it at the Central American Exposition of 1897; the other copy was kept in the library of the Ministry of Foreign Affairs and then given to the poet Joaquín Yela to make another translation.

The Jesuits returned to Guatemala in 1955. After the overthrow of the Guzmán government in 1956, there was a considerable boom in the creation of Catholic schools and in 1961 the Jesuits founded the Rafael Landívar University.

== Notes ==
^{a} The house that belonged to Landívar is still identified as his in Antigua Guatemala.

^{b} See also note 3.
