= Grupo Saker-Ti =

Guatemalan writers group

Grupo Saker-Ti was a Guatemalan group of writers formed in 1947. The name derives from the Cakchiquel language word for "dawn." Because they were left-wing ideologues who supported the democratically elected presidents of Guatemala Juan José Arévalo and Jacobo Arbenz Guzmán, a December 1952 United States Central Intelligence Agency report stated that "one of the oldest and most consistently prominent of the (Communist) front groups is Grupo Saker-Ti, an organization formed by militant young intellectuals associated with the leftist-nationalist Revolution of 1944."

The movement disbanded and many of its members fled Guatemala following the 1954 Operation PBSuccess that overthrew the government.

Grupo Saker-Ti members included:

- Julio Fausto Aguilera (b. 1929), poet
- Huberto Alvarado (1927-1974), poet, politician
- Melvin René Barahona (1931-1965), poet
- Adalberto de León Soto (1919-1957), sculptor
- Abelardo Rodas Barrios (1930-1988), poet
- Carlos Navarrete (b. 1931), writer, anthropologist
- Raúl Leiva (1916-1975), poet
- Werner Ovalle López (1928-1970), poet
- Oscar Arturo Palencia (1932-1981), writer
- Roberto Paz y Paz (1927-2004), journalist
- Rafael Sosa (b. 1928), poet
- Olga Martínez Torres, (b. 1927), poet
- José María López Valdizón (1929-1975), writer
- Orlando Vitola (1922-1952), writer
- Enrique Palmer (b. 1934), writer and poet.
- Jorge Sarmientos (1931-2012), musician
