= Juan Pablo Suazo Euceda =

Juan Pablo Suazo Euceda (born 1972 in Catacamas) is a Honduran author and agricultural engineer. He has spent more than ten years working in the La Mosquitia, a jungle region in north eastern Honduras. His first published work was Percepción y uso de la vida silvestre while his second book, a novel called Segovia, published in 2008, and named after the river of the same name found in La Mosquitia, won the 2008 Hibuera literary prize. He published a second book called Yalas en el mundo de Walamsa, is another novel based on the River Patuca, also in La Mosquitia region. His third book, published in 2013, is for children and is called Lea y las semillas de Kisanka.
