= Margarita Carrera =

Guatemalan writer (1929–2018)

Margarita Carrera Molina
- Born: 16 September 1929; Guatemala City, Guatemala
- Died: 31 March 2018 (aged 88); Guatemala City, Guatemala
- Other name: Margarita Carrera de Wever
- Occupations: writer, philosopher, educator
- Years active: 1957–2018

Margarita Carrera Molina (16 September 1929 – 31 March 2018) was a Guatemalan philosopher, professor and writer. She was a member of the Academia Guatemalteca de la Lengua and the 1996 laureate of the Miguel Ángel Asturias National Prize in Literature.

== Early life ==
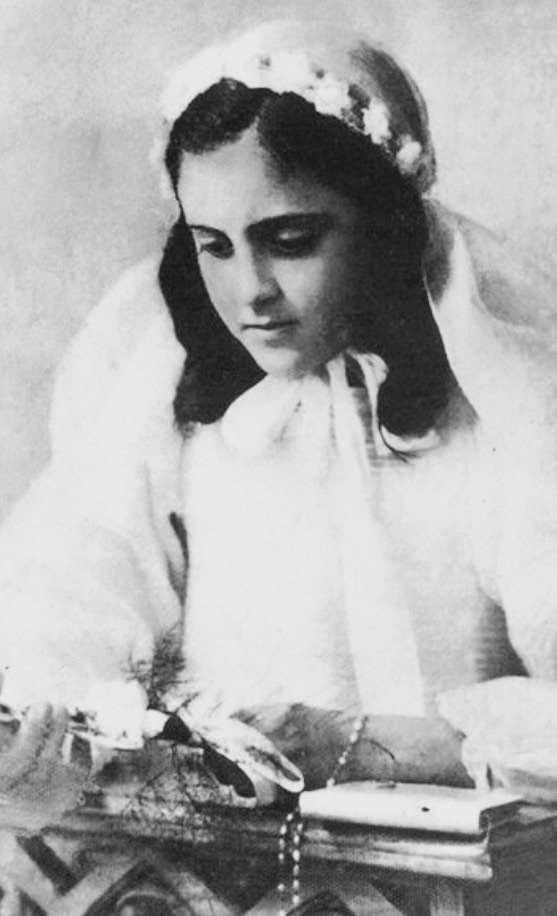
Carrera as a child

Margarita Carrera Molina was born 16 September 1929 in Guatemala City to Frenchman Antonio Carrera Martello and Josefina Molina Llardén. Her father committed suicide when she was a child and she had to work to help support her family, going to night school to learn. She was the first female graduate in Literature from Universidad de San Carlos de Guatemala in 1957.

== Career ==
From 1957 she was employed as a university professor at her alma mater, as well as Rafael Landívar University and Universidad del Valle de Guatemala. She was a lecturer at the Autonomous University of Madrid and served as guest writer on numerous international congresses held in Costa Rica, France, Germany, France, Germany, Mexico, Panama, Puerto Rico, Spain, Sweden, the US and Venezuela. She was the first woman to ever become a member of the Academia Guatemalteca de la Lengua in 1967.

Carrera joined the International Writing Program at the University of Iowa, in Iowa City, IA in 1982. From 1993 she worked as a columnist for Prensa Libre of Guatemala and published in many other newspapers, including Diario de Centro America, La Hora, and El Imparcial. She wrote two columns at Prensa Libre weekly, in addition to having published twenty books. In 1996, she was awarded the Miguel Ángel Asturias National Prize in Literature.

In an interview in her 70s, Carrera said that she often wrote about men she found interesting and whom she studied to help her understand the man she never knew, her father. Among those she studied and wrote about were Argentine writer Jorge Luis Borges, Austrian psychoanalyst Sigmund Freud, Spanish poet Juan Ramón Jiménez, German philosopher Friedrich Nietzsche and Spanish philosopher Miguel de Unamuno. After his death, she read about Juan José Gerardi Conedera and ended up writing a novel about his life: En la mirilla del jaguar: biografía novelada de Monseñor Gerardi, published in 2002. She was awarded the Monseñor Gerardi Conedera Order in 2004.

== Personal life and death ==
Carrera was married for seven years and divorced. She had two children. Carrera died in Guatemala on 31 March 2018 at the age of 88.

== Awards ==
- 1981 Golden Quetzal for "Ensayos contra reloj"
- 1982 First Prize in poetry for "Mujer y soledades" from Juegos Florales Centroamericanos y de Panamá, Quetzaltenango, Guatemala
- 1982 Finalist in the XI Anagram Essay Prize in Barcelona, Spain
- 1986 First Prize in poetry for "Signo XX" from Juegos Florales Hispanoamericanos, Quetzaltenango, Guatemala
- 1988 Vicenta Laparra Order
- 1996 Miguel Ángel Asturias National Prize in Literature
- 2000 Meritorious Service Medal Universidad de San Carlos de Guatemala
- 2000 Communications award from UNICEF
- 2004 Monseñor Gerardi Conedera Order

== Selected works ==
=== Books ===
- En la mirilla del jaguar Guatemala City: Fondo de Cultura Económica (2002) (In Spanish)
- Sumario del recuerdo Guatemala (2006) (In Spanish)

=== Poetry ===
- Poemas pequeños Guatemala: Ministerio de Educación Pública (1951) (In Spanish)
- Poesías Guatemala: Universidad de San Carlos de Guatemala (1957) (In Spanish)
- Desde Dentro Guatemala: Editorial Universitaria (1964) (In Spanish)
- Poemas de sangre y alba Guatemala: Editorial Universitaria (1969) (In Spanish)
- Del noveno circulo y antología mínima Guatemala: Editorial Universitaria (1977) (In Spanish)
- Mujer y Soledades Guatemala: General de Cultura y Bellas Artes (1982) (In Spanish)
- Toda la poesía de Margarita Carrera Guatemala: Tipografía Nacional (1984) (In Spanish)
- Obra ensayística Guatemala: Tipografía Nacional (1985) (In Spanish)
- Signo XX Guatemala: Serviprensa Centroamericana (1986) (In Spanish)
- Sumario del olvido Antología personal de poesía Guatemala: Editorial Cultura (1998) (In Spanish)
- Iracundiae dea Madrid: Ediciones Torremozas (2008) (In Spanish)

=== Essays ===
- Corpus poeticum de la obra de Juan Diéguez Guatemala: Universidad de San Carlos de Guatemala (1957) (In Spanish)
- Ensayos Guatemala: Editorial Escolar Piedra Santa (1974) (In Spanish)
- Literatura y psicoanálisis Guatemala City: Universidad de San Carlos de Guatemala (1979) (In Spanish)
- Ensayos contra el reloj Guatemala: Serviprensa Centroamericana (1980) (In Spanish)
- Nietzsche y la tragedia Guatemala: Editorial Universitaria (1982) (In Spanish)
- Antropos Guatemala: Editorial Universitaria de Guatemala (1985) (In Spanish)
- El desafío del psicoanálisis freudiano Guatemala: Editorial Universitaria (1988) (In Spanish)
- Freud y los sueños Guatemala: Edinter Centroamericana (1990) (In Spanish)
- Octavio Paz y su mundo de palabras (co-writer Eusebio Rojas Guzmán) Guatemala: Ediciones Ventana (1993)(In Spanish)
- Hacia un nuevo humanismo Guatemala: Editorial Artemis-Edinter (1996) (In Spanish)
- Antología personal Guatemala: Editorial Cultura (1997) (In Spanish)
- Ensayos sobre Borges Guatemala: Editorial Universitaria (1999) (In Spanish)

=== Theater ===
- El circo: farsátira en un acto Guatemala: Editorial Escolar Piedra Santa (1975) (In Spanish)
