= Teresa Bolaños de Zarco =

Salvadoran-born Guatemalan journalist

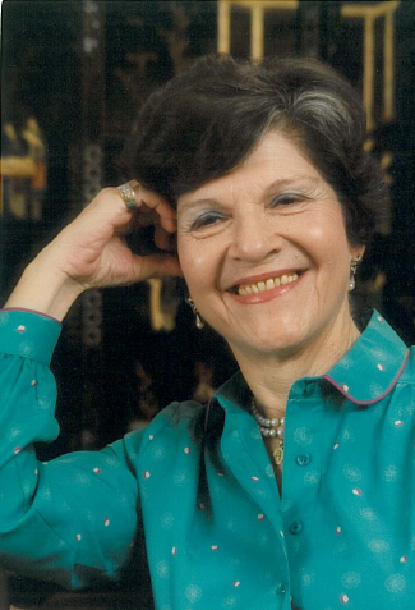
Teresa Bolaños de Zarco, 2012

Teresa Bolaños de Zarco (October 9, 1922 – December 24, 1998) was a Salvadoran-born Guatemalan journalist, writer, and businesswoman who fought for freedom of the press and for the rights of Soviet Jews. Having served as president of several organizations, and being a naturalized citizen of Guatemala, she was honored as "Notable Citizen in a Lifetime" by the President of the Republic, Vinicio Cerezo.

== Biography ==
Teresa (nickname, "Tere") Bolaños de Zarco was born in Santa Ana, El Salvador, October 9, 1922.

De Zarco was a journalist by profession and a writer. De Zarco was a co-founder (1956-57) and President of the Association of Women Journalists of Guatemala. She served as President of the People's Health League (1957-70); Voluntary and Municipal Fire Brigades fundraising campaign (1971-72); Press Freedom Commission (1996); and Guatemalan Chamber of Journalism (1986-87; 1991-92). In addition, she was the Chairman of the Free Press Board of Directors (1996-1998). She was the founder and Vice President, of the National Reconciliation Commission. De Zarco was appointed Itinerant Ambassador in 1992; and Ambassador Extraordinary and Plenipotentiary in Special Mission in 1995. She also published five books on different topics.

She represented Guatemala in the "Congreso de Defensa de los Derechos Humanos de las minorías Judías de la Unión Soviética" on four occasions: Buenos Aires, Argentina (1973); San José, Costa Rica (1974); and Mexico City (1975; 1977).

== Personal life ==
She married the journalist Isidoro Zarco Alfasa, co-founder of Prensa Libre. In 1972, two years after his death, she created the "Isidoro Zarco award". In 1997, she also created the “Tere de Zarco award", for the best student of Communication Sciences in all of the universities in the country. Both awards were organized with the Guatemalan Chamber of Journalism. She was the mother of three children: Manuel, Teresa and José Eduardo.

De Zarco became a naturalized citizen of Guatemala. She died in Guatemala City, December 24, 1998.

== Awards and honors ==
- "Notable Citizen in a Lifetime", conferred by government decree by the President of the Republic, Vinicio Cerezo

== Selected works ==
- 1973, El Pensamiento Vivo de Isidoro Zarco
- 1993, Y salió [ 6 ]
- 1996, La culebra en la Corbata (Chronicle of the peace process in Guatemala.)
