= Isabel de los Ángeles Ruano =

Guatemalan writer, poet, journalist and teacher

Isabel de los Ángeles Ruano (born June 3, 1945, in Chiquimula) is a Guatemalan writer, poet, journalist and teacher. In 1954, she moved with her parents to Mexico; they returned to Guatemala three years later, living in various locations within Jutiapa Department and Chiquimula Department. In Chiquimula, she entered the Instituto Normal de Señoritas de Oriente. She graduated from Educación Primaria Urbana with a teacher's diploma in 1964 at the age 18. In 1966, she traveled on her own to Mexico, where she published her first book, entitled Cariátides, the foreword of the book having been written by the Spanish poet León Felipe. Returning to Guatemala in 1967, she began working in journalism. In 1978, she completed her university studies in Spanish and Latin American Language and Literature at the Universidad de San Carlos de Guatemala. In the late 1980s, she began to suffer from mental disorders. She was awarded the Miguel Ángel Asturias National Prize in Literature by the Ministry of Culture in 2001. Dressing as a man, she has lived for several years in Guatemala City's colonia Justo Rufino Barrios, zona 21.

== Selected works ==
=== Books ===
- 1967: Cariátides
- 1988: Canto de amor a la ciudad de Guatemala
- 1988: Torres y tatuajes
- 1999: Los del viento
- 2002: Café express
- 2006: Versos dorados

=== Best-known poems ===
- A Luis Cernuda.
- Cantar indio.
- Caricatura de la verdad.
- Cinematógrafo.
- Dolor.
- El silencio cerrado.
- Frente al espejo.
- Hora sin soporte.
- La noche.
- Los del viento.
- Los desterrados.
- Mi casa y mi palabra.
- Mis manos.
- Muerte en el tiempo.
- Onán.
- Palabras a Ángela Figuera Aymerich.
- Poema de la sangre.
- Tres poemas ágiles.
