= Dina Posada =

Dina Posada (born 1946, El Salvador) is one of Central America’s poets. Fuego sobre el madero, a collection of poems that celebrate love, eroticism and the female body was published in 1996..

She is a Salvadoran-Guatemalan citizen, who studied journalism in El Salvador and psychology in Guatemala—where she has resided since 1970. She worked in El Salvador’s La Prensa Gráfica from 1965 to 1969, and currently is a contributing literary writer to several publications in Guatemala.

Since Fuego sobre el madero, Posada’s poetry has generated substantial literary criticism in Latin America, the United States and Europe, among which is the title Afrodita en el trópico (Scripta Humanistica, 1999). Some of Posada’s poems have been translated into other languages and can be found in several local and international anthologies; her work has also inspired other artistic endeavors, such as "Novembre Vaca" (Barcelona, 2005) and "Exilio," a mural exposition (Canada, 2004).

== Works ==
=== Poetry ===
- Hilos de la noche (1993)
- Fuego sobre el madero (1996)

=== Anthologies ===
- Mujeres en la literatura salvadoreña (El Salvador, 1997)
- Voces sin fronteras (Wisconsin, 1999)
- Voces nuevas (Madrid, 2000)
- Mujer, desnudez y palabras (Guatemala, 2002)
- Poesía salvadoreña del siglo XX (France, 2002)
- Stigar/Senderos (Sweden, 2003)
- El monte de las delicias (Barcelona, 2004)
- Trilogía poética de las mujeres en Hispanoamérica. Pícaras, místicas y rebeldes (Mexico, 2004)
- Mujer, cuerpo y palabra (Madrid, 2004)
- Jinetes del aire (Ecuador y México, 2005)
- Poetas en blanco y negro. Contemporáneos (Madrid, 2006)
- Al filo del gozo, (México, 2008)
- Poetas por El Salvador, Poema paseo coral (El Salvador-Francia, 2008)
