= Ana María Rodas =

Guatemalan writer

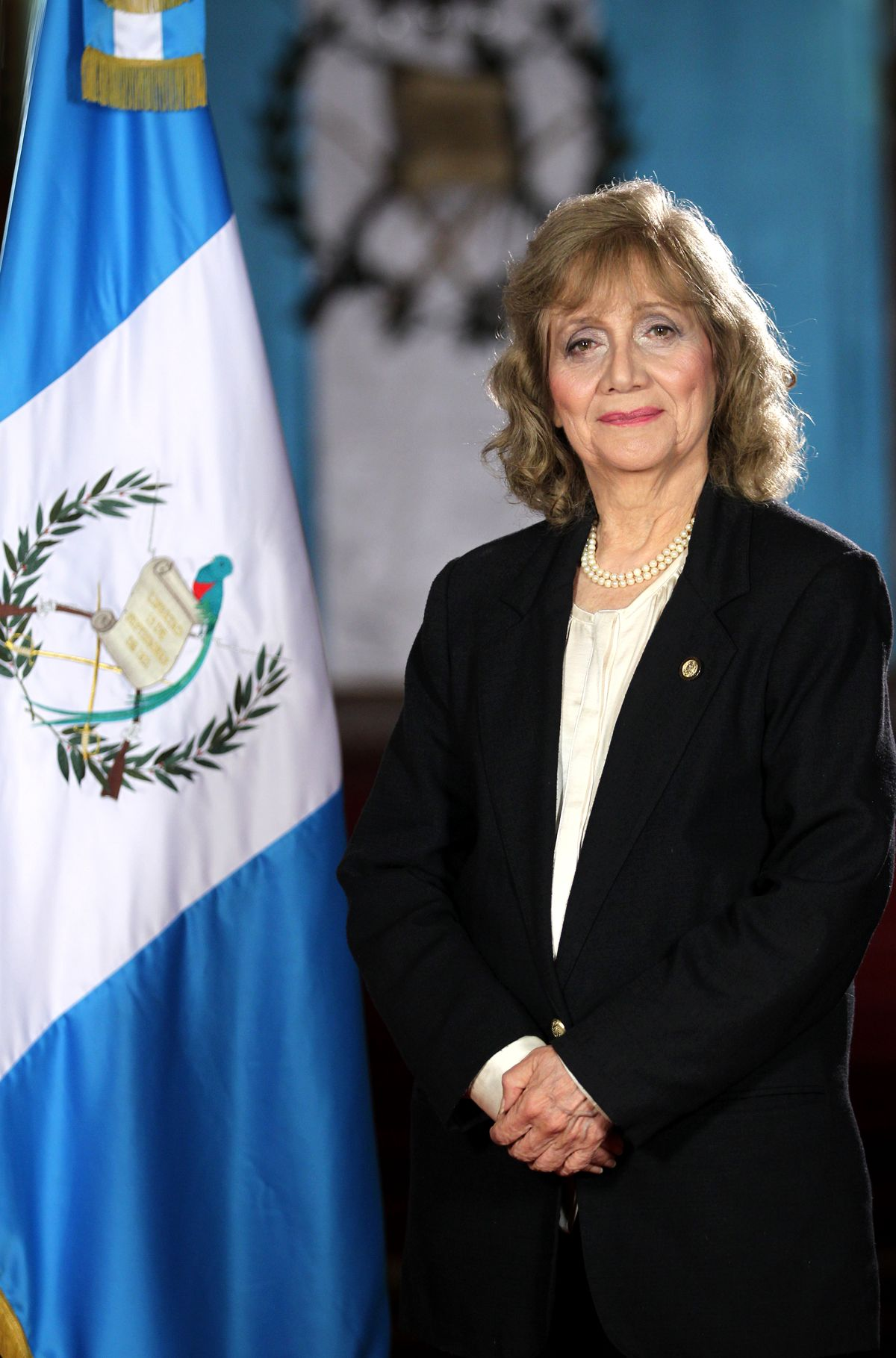

Minister of Culture and Sports
- In office September 18, 2015 – January 14, 2016
- President: Alejandro Maldonado
- Preceded by: Dwight Pezzarossi
- Succeeded by: José Luis Chea Urruela

Personal details
- Born: 12 September 1937 (age 89) Guatemala City, Guatemala
- Occupation: Writer, Poet, Journalist, Critic, Teacher
- Writing career
- Genres: Story, Journalism, Essay and Poetry

Ana María Rodas (born 1937 in Guatemala City) is a Guatemalan journalist and poet, and a figure of the Central American literary panorama.

== Biography ==
Rodas was born in Guatemala City on September 12, 1937. Her grandfathers were, respectively, an anthropologist and a theatrical entrepreneur. Her father, Ovidio Rodas Corzo, worked as a journalist – first for El Imparcial and later for the Diario de Centro América – and also as a painter. From childhood, she was immersed in a cultural environment shaped by art, literature, and the press. Her mother, Ana María Pérez Lagomazzini, read adult books aloud to her and her brother from an early age.

Rodas spent much of her childhood at the printing press and began writing at a young age, eventually choosing journalism as a discipline that sustained her literary habits. Her first job was at the Diario de Centro América. By age 14 she was covering social and sports columns, and by 16 she had become a staff reporter. She later moved on to covering governmental affairs.

== Career ==
In 1973, Rodas published her first book of poems Poemas de la izquierda erótica (Poems of the Erotic Left), which caused significant controversy for challenging conservative social norms around female sexuality, pregnancy, marriage, and individual freedom, generating considerable public controversy. Rodas has noted that male contemporaries such as Enrique "Quinque" Noriega and Luis Eduardo Rivera published similarly irreverent work, yet her book attracted far greater outcry precisely because she was a woman..

In 1974, she was awarded the Freedom of the Press Prize by the Association of Journalists of Guatemala.

She subsequently published Cuatro esquinas del juego de una muñeca (1975) and El fin de los mitos y los sueños (1984). The latter received an honorable mention at the 1980 Juegos Florales Hispanoamericanos – an annual literary competition in poetry, novel, and short story, organized by the Permanent Commission of Juegos Florales Hispanoamericanos and the Municipality of Quetzaltenango – in the category open to Mexico, Central America, and the Caribbean.

In 1984 she began teaching at the University of San Carlos of Guatemala, and from 1993 at Rafael Landívar University. She has also lectured at Francisco Marroquín University and Universidad Panamericana.

She has served as director of the Diario de Centro América, director of the National Typography (2004–2008), director of the National Library of Guatemala (2012), and Minister of Culture and Sports (2015–2016).

In 1990, she received an honorable mention from the Juegos Florales Hispanoamericanos, a literary contest. In 2000, she was awarded the Guatemala National Prize in Literature.

Her books have been translated into German, English, and Italian.

On September 9, 2017, she received the honor of being named Illustrious Person for her contribution to universal literature, recognition granted during the San Carlos University of Guatemala's three-hundredth anniversary.

== Feminist views ==
Unlike many feminists of her generation who arrived at the movement through Simone de Beauvoir, Rodas's entry point was Shulamith Firestone, one of the foundational voices of radical feminism and the second wave of the women's movement. As she has put it: "Women lived feminism – we didn't gather to talk about it."

Her debut collection has been analyzed by scholar Juan Carlos Galeano, poet and professor at Florida State University, as evidence of her feminist commitment – describing it as a text of erotic affirmation and critical discourse whose foundation addresses the problematics of sex, writing, and power relations, particularly those of patriarchal paradigms reproduced within sectors of the political left.

== Selected works ==
- Narrative by Ana María Rodas. Book in Audio Cassette, Ministry of Culture, Guatemala, 1995
- Mariana in the Tigrera, 1996
- The Nun, 2002
