= Máximo Soto Hall =

Guatemalan novelist (1871–1944)

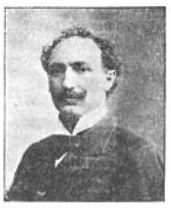
Máximo Soto Hall in 1907

Máximo Soto Hall (1871-1944) was a Guatemalan novelist. He is most known for his 1899 novel El problema, though he is recognized in Central America for the whole of his literary output. He was born in Guatemala City in 1871, and served in the dictatorship of Manuel Estrada (whose government served as a model for Miguel Ángel Asturias' novel El Señor Presidente) until 1919, at which time he emigrated to Costa Rica, and then to Buenos Aires, Argentina, where he served as a journalist for the newspaper La Prensa. He died in 1944 in Buenos Aires and his body is interred in the San Lázaro cemetery in Antigua Guatemala. Many of his novels, including El problema and La sombra de la Casa Blanca, concern the presence and influence of the United States in Central America. La sombra was published by El Ateneo in Buenos Aires. His works traverse a great number of literary traditions, including Modernismo and the historical novel, the latter influenced by his fellow countryman José Milla. He also wrote poetry, as well as political treatises and sociological works.

== Partial bibliography ==
- El ideal, 1894
- El problema, 1899
- Catalina, 1900
- Herodías, 1927
- La sombra de la Casa Blanca, 1927
- Don Diego Portales, 1935
- La divina reclusa, 1938

== Sources ==
- Albizúrez Palma, Francisco and Catalina Barrios y Barrios. Historia de la literatura guatemalteca, tomo 2.

Guatemala: Editorial Universitaria, 1982.
