= Carlos Solórzano =

Mexican playwright

Carlos Solórzano Fernández
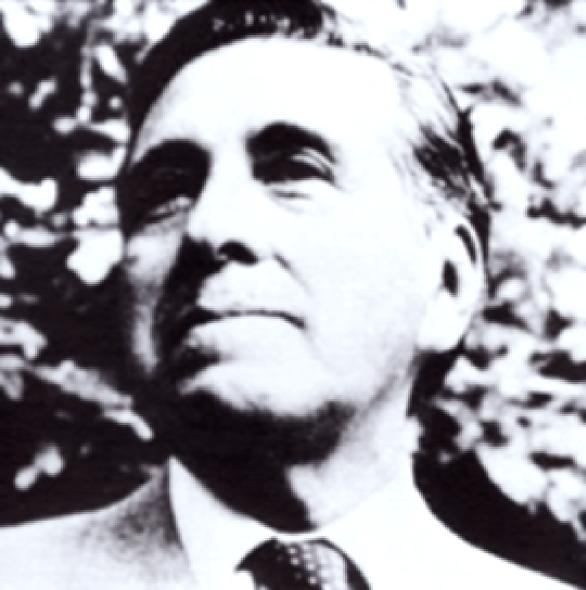
- Born: May 6, 1922; San Marcos, Guatemala
- Died: March 30, 2011 (aged 91); Mexico City, Mexico
- Spouse: Beatriz Caso
- Writing career
- Language: Spanish
- Genre: Playwright

Carlos Solórzano Fernández (May 6, 1922 – March 30, 2011) was a Guatemalan-born Mexican playwright. He is considered one of the most important playwrights in Guatemalan history. His contribution to the theater in Latin America range from his plays to articles in theater journals and encyclopedias, and essays related to the history and anthology of Latin theater.

== Biography ==
Carlos Solórzano was born in 1919 to a wealthy family in San Marcos in Guatemala.

In 1939 Carlos Solórzano moved to Mexico. In 1945 he graduated from the Universidad Nacional Autónoma de México as an architect, as a master and doctor of letters 1946–1948. His first play, Espejo de novelas, was penned in 1946. In 1948, a grant from the Rockefeller Foundation permitted him to study drama at Sorbonne, Paris, France. During his studies in France, he became acquainted with many prominent men of letters such as Camus and Ghelderode and their influence and dramatic style would be a major influence in his later works as indeed in increasing his interest in theatrical subjects in general.

Solórzano returned to Mexico City. He began writing a number of plays, some of which are important to Mexican theatre today. Doña Beatriz, la sin ventura (1954), El hechicero (1954), Las manos de Dios (1957), El crucificado (1957), Los fantoches (1959), Tres actos (1959) are amongst his notable works in the 1950s. His play El crucificado, is a reenactment of Jesus Christ's crucifixion. A number of his works are allegorical ranging from political allegories with hidden agendas to explorations of the reason for man's existence.

Solórzano represented Mexico in the first playwrighting workshop in Puerto Rico in 1960 and in 1963 was representative of Mexico's Festival of Theater of Nations in Paris with his work Los fantoches. He attended the XI Congreso de Literatura Iberoamericana in Austin, Texas.

Solórzano is a recipient of the Miguel Ángel Asturias Award (Premio Nacional de Literatura 'Miguel Ángel Asturias') given to those who excel in literature in Guatemala. He was awarded this honor in 1989.

Solórzano was an active university lecturer and director. He has served as the director of the Teatro Universitario as well as the director of the Museo Nacional de Teatro. He has lectured in several universities in the United States including Columbia University, the University of Southern California, and the University of Kansas. He was a professor at the Autonomous University of Latin America, and an editor of the theatrical encyclopedia, Enciclopedia Mundial del Teatro Contemporaneo, before he died in 2011.

Solórzano died in Mexico City, on March 30, 2011.

== Plays ==
- Espejo de Novelas (1946)
- Doña Beatriz, la sin ventura (1954)
- El hechicero (1954)
- Las manos de Dios (1957)
- El Crucificado (1957)
- Mea culpa (1958)
- Los fantoches de andalucia (1959)
- Cruce de vías (1959)
- Tres actos (1959)
- Los falsos demonios (1963)
- El zapato (1971)
- El sueño del angel
