= Javier Payeras =

Guatemalan poet, novelist, and essayist

Javier Antonio Payeras (born 6 February 1974 in Guatemala City) is a Guatemalan poet, novelist, and essayist.

== Biography ==
Central American writer (Guatemala 1974). He is one of the writers who emerged after the Guatemalan Civil War as part of the so-called postwar generation. From 1998, he joined an emerging movement called Casa Bizarra, a project of young artists from the post-conflict generation. A tireless promoter of culture, he was coordinator of the Festival Octubreazul in 2000, director of the Contemporary Art Foundation Colloquia, and curator of Project Crea.

== Published works ==
- Fondo para un disco de John Zorn (poetry, 2013)
- Soledadbrother (stage adaptation by Luis Carlos Pineda and Josué Sotomayor) Centro Cultural de Spain in Guatemala and Catafixia Editorial (2013
- Imágenes para un View-Master (fiction, 2003, 2010)
- Soledadbrother (poetry, 2003, 2010)
- Ruido de Fondo (fiction, 2003, 2006)
- Afuera (fiction, 2006)
- Las palabras que luego abandonamos (poetry, 2007)
- Lecturas menores (reviews and literary essays, 2008)
- Dos de sal Gema / Relatos autodidactas (poetry and narrative, 2008)
- Días Amarillos (novel, 2009)
- Post-its de luz sucia (poetry, 2009)
- La resignación y la asfixia (poetry, 2011)
- (...) y otros relatos breves (short stories, 2000, 2012)
- limbo (fiction, 2011)
- Déjate caer (poetry, 2012)
- Raktas (fiction, 2000, 2013)
