= Carmen Naranjo =

Costa Rican novelist, poet and essayist (1928–2012)

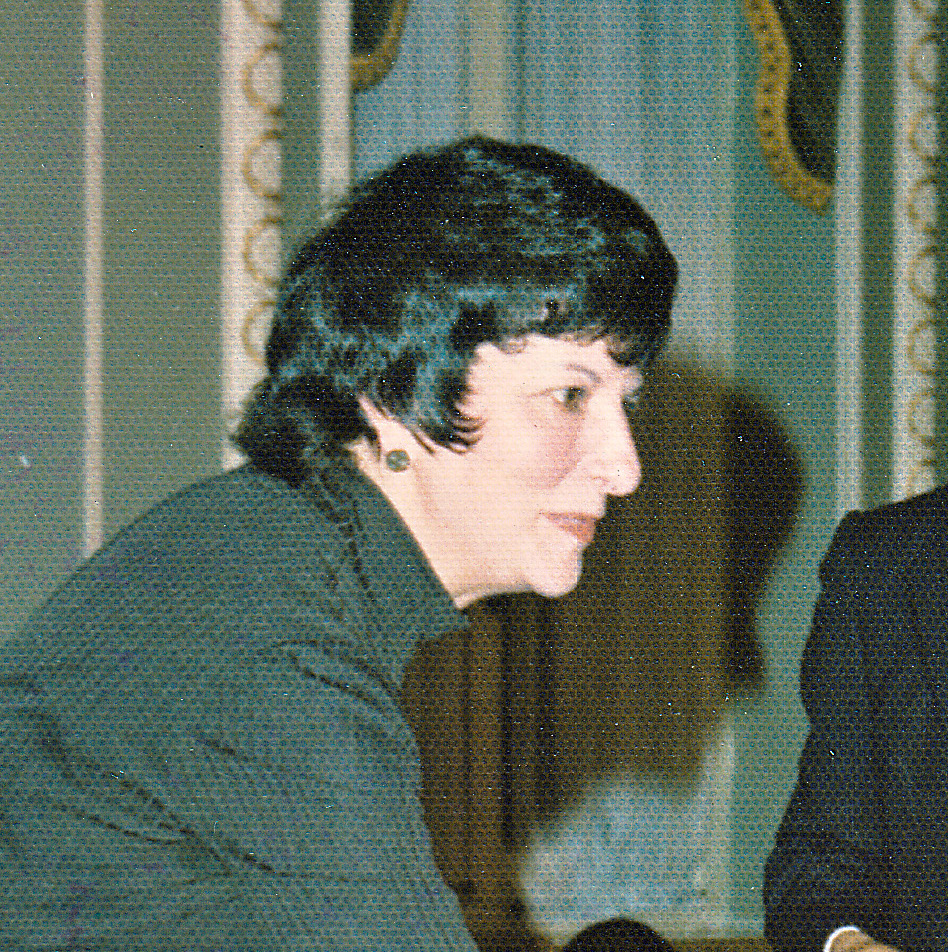
- Born: January 30, 1928; Cartago, Costa Rica
- Died: January 4, 2012 (aged 83)
- Education: University of Costa Rica; National Autonomous University of Mexico; University of Iowa; Iowa Writers' Workshop
- Occupations: Novelist; poet; essayist

Carmen Naranjo Coto (January 30, 1928 – January 4, 2012) was a Costa Rican novelist, poet and essayist. She was a recipient of the Aquileo J. Echeverría National Prize.

== Life ==
Naranjo was born in Cartago, the capital city of the Cartago Province. She received her primary education there at the Escuela República de Perú and her secondary at the Colegio Superior de Señoritas.

She received her licenciatura in Philology from the University of Costa Rica and pursued post-graduate studies at the Universidad Autónoma de México and the University of Iowa.

Naranjo served as Costa Rica's ambassador to Israel in the 1970s and also as the country's minister of culture (1974-1976). She was the author of the Costa Rican system of social security. She was inducted into La Galería de las Mujeres de Costa Rica (The Women's Gallery of Costa Rica) in 2005.

== Literary career ==
Naranjo wrote multiple books, including poetry, novels, storybooks, and essays. Her novels and stories have had much success, such as her first novel Los perros no ladraron (1966); however, Naranjo is also known for her poetry, such as La canción de la ternura (1964) and Hacia tu isla (1966).

After Naranjo returned to Costa Rica in 1964, having worked for United Nations in Venezuela, her literary career began to take off. She enrolled in a writer's workshop, led by Lilia Ramos (Costa Rican essayist), she began reading work by Latin American authors such as Carlos Fuentes, Juan Rulfo, Jorge Luis Borges, and Octavio Paz, and she published her first volumes of poetry, Hacia tu isla (1966) and Misa a oscuras (1964). She published her first novel, Los perros no ladraron in 1966, and in 1968, two more followed: Memorias de un hombre de palabra and Camino al mediodía. The success she had from her first three novels opened an international opportunity for her career and literary reputation. Upon accepting an invitation to the University of Iowa in the United States, Naranjo spent a year in 1969 in the Iowa Writers' Workshop, where she completed her next novel, Diario de una multitud (published in 1974).

In 1970, after much success with Camino al mediodía, which won second place in The Central American and Panama Flower Games (Los Juegos Florales Centroamericanos y de Panamá), she began to teach workshops (writing classes), and as a direct result of these classes, Naranjo was inspired to write her next notable novel, Responso Por El Niño Juan Manuel (1970).

== Final Years ==
Carmen Naranjo regularly went to her cabin located on a coffee plantation near Alajuela, which allowed her "retreat from the hectic life of San José", where she spent most of her time with her workshops and pursuing her own works. After her death on January 4, 2012, the Minister of Culture, Manuel Obregón, said that, "She has two important facets. One is as a cultural manager, in her role as Minister, which is basic and transcendental. On the other hand, her literary facet, the poetic part, which I think had some extremely important moments for world poetry, that on the artistic side."

== Bibliography ==
- Cancion de la ternura, 1964
- Misa a oscuras, 1964
- Hacia tu isla, 1966
- Los perros no ladraron, 1966
- Memorias de un hombre palabra, 1968
- Diario de una multitud, 1974
- Cinco años en busca de un pensador, 1977
- Mi guerrilla, 1977
- Nunca hubo alguna vez, 1984
- El caso 117.720, 1987
- En partes, 1994
- Más allá del Parismina, 2001
- En esta tierra redonda y plana, 2001
- Marina Jiménez de Bolandi: recordándola, 2002
- El Truco Florido,

=== Translations of her short stories into English ===
- Rosario Santos (ed.), And We Sold the Rain: Contemporary Fiction from Central America (title story in the collection), Seven Stories Press, (2nd edition 1996); ISBN 1-888363-03-7
- Barbara Ras (ed.), Costa Rica: A Traveler's Literary Companion, Whereabouts Press (1993); ISBN 1-883513-00-6
- Linda Britt (trans.), There Never Was a Once Upon a Time, Latin American Literary Review Press (1989); ISBN 978-0935480412
- Andrés Alfaro (trans.), "Wouldn't You Believe It?" Trinity Jolt Journal of Literary Translation. Vol. 2. (Apr. 2014). Translated from the short story "A qué no me van a creer?" by Carmen Naranjo.
