= Luz Méndez de la Vega =

Guatemalan writer (1919–2012)

- Born: 2 September 1919; Retalhuleu, Guatemala
- Died: 8 March 2012 (aged 92); Guatemala City, Guatemala
- Occupations: feminist, writer, educator
- Years active: 1942–2002

Luz Méndez de la Vega (2 September 1919 – 8 March 2012) was a Guatemalan feminist writer, journalist, poet, academic and actress. As an academic, she concentrated on researching and rescuing the work of colonial Guatemalan women writers. She was the winner of Guatemala's highest prize for literature, Miguel Ángel Asturias National Literature Prize, and the Chilean Pablo Neruda Medal, among many other literary awards throughout her career.

== Biography ==
Luz Méndez de la Vega was born on 2 September 1919 in Retalhuleu, Guatemala to José Méndez Valle and Susana de la Vega. Her father, who was a doctor, but politically active, was forced into exile with his family in 1921. They fled to Tapachula, Chiapas, Mexico, where Méndez began school at age four. Her family wanted her to attend a religious school, which was impossible at that time in Mexico, so she was sent to a convent school in El Salvador, where she first discovered literature at about age 9 or 10. When the family returned to Guatemala, she attended the Instituto Normal Central para Señoritas Belén which was the teachers' college, earning a teaching certificate and simultaneously studied at the Liceo Francés, earning a diploma in French. She finished her schooling at 17 and instead of pursuing university studies, Méndez married and had her first child when she was 20.

She started doing charity work with María de Árbenz, at the Social Welfare Auxiliary Service, and was asked by José Castañeda if she would write about her work for the newspaper. She began her career as a journalist, writing for the newspaper El Imparcial and then managing and writing for the cultural page of La Hora. She joined the Association of Journalists of Guatemala and published numerous articles in La Nación”, El Gráfico, Siglo Veintiuno, and Prensa Libre throughout her lifetime.

In 1944, she decided to go back to school, and earned a bachelor of Arts from Universidad de San Carlos de Guatemala and a doctorate in literature at the Complutense University of Madrid, Spain Upon completion of her studies, she worked as a professor, at the University of San Carlos and conducted research. She pursued feminist themes and specifically, she sought to rescue the work of feminist writers from Guatemala's colonial past. During her time at the university, the military government targeted intellectuals and on several occasions, Méndez had to flee from police and shooting incidents. Later, she also was a professor at Rafael Landívar University in Guatemala City.

In 1955, Méndez founded, along with others, the theatrical Grupo Artístico de Escenificación Moderna (GADEM) (Artistic Group of Modern Staging), to give contemporary playwrights an avenue for their pieces to be performed. She became an accomplished actress and the group annually staged new plays. During the 1970s, the military dictatorship suppressed artists. Two groups formed, "The Moira" made up mostly of students and teachers with a focus on theater and "Rin-78", made up of writers, to give artists venues for expression. Méndez was a member of both groups.

Méndez wrote many poems, articles and books, as well as literary criticisms. Among her most important works are "Eva sin Dios" (1979), "Poetisas desmitificadoras guatemaltecas" (1994) and La amada y perseguida Sor Juana Inés de Maldonado y Paz (2002). In Las voces silenciadas (poema feminista) she wrote about how the violence, terror, injustice and misery of the war, which though not officially declared, had devastated women’s lives from 1962-1996 and how patriarchy and enforced silence had repressed Guatemalan women and their concepts of identity and image. Her 2002 work, Mujer, desnudez y palabras was considered so important that a documentary of the same name was released at the 7th National Congress of Writers in Guatemala in 2006 and in 2008, she was awarded the Emeritus Medal of Scientific Researcher from the Institute of Studies of National Literature of the Faculty of Humanities and the Institute of Women both at the University of San Carlos.

She was appointed a member of the Guatemalan Academy of Language, the country's association with the Spanish Royal Academy of Language.

Méndez died on International Women's Day, 8 March 2012 in Guatemala City, Guatemala and was buried in the General Cemetery of Guatemala.

== Awards ==
- 1977 Second Prize in the APG Bernal Díaz del Castillo-Rama Crónica
- 1978 First Prize in the APG Bernal Díaz del Castillo-Rama Crónica
- 1981 Awarded the Order of Dolores Bedoya de Molina
- 1981 APG Cruz Medal of Artistic Merit
- 1982 Second Prize in the APG Bernal Díaz del Castillo-Rama Crónica
- 1983 First Prize in the Poesía en el Certamen Permanente Centroamericana for De las palabras y la sombra
- 1991 Trophy Opus de las Artes—Teatro
- 1992 Medal from the National Office of Women
- 1994 Medal from the National Magazine Dante Alighieri Society
- 1994 Miguel Ángel Asturias National Literature Prize
- 1998 Medal of the Order of Vicenta Laparra de la Cerda
- 2003 Medal of the Order of Ixmukané
- 2004 Pablo Neruda Medal, Chile
- 2008 Emeritus Medal of Scientific Researcher
- 2012 Medal of Meritorious Citizen FLACSO (awarded posthumously)

== Selected works ==
=== Books ===
- Estética y poesía de Petrarca Guatemala: Universidad de San Carlos de Guatemala, (1974) (in Spanish)
- El Señor Presidente y Tirano Banderas Guatemala: Universidad de San Carlos de Guatemala Facultad de Humanidades, (1977) (in Spanish)
- Caraterísticas del estilo de Galdós y su influjo en la novela guatemalteca Guatemala: Universidad de San Carlos de Guatemala Facultad de Humanidades, (1978) (in Spanish)
- Flor de varia poesía: poetas humanistas Guatemala: Editorial José de Pineda Ibarra, (1978) (in Spanish)
- Aproximación a dos mundos: Quevedo-Bécquer Guatemala: Universidad de San Carlos de Guatemala Facultad de Humanidades, (1979) (in Spanish)
- La poesía de Eugenio Montale Guatemala: Universidad de San Carlos de Guatemala Facultad de Humanidades, (1979) (in Spanish)
- Eva sin Dios 1979 Guatemala: Editorial Marroquín, (1979) (in Spanish)
- Tríptico: Tiempo de amor, tiempo de llanto y desamor Guatemala: Editorial Marroquín, (1980) (in Spanish)
- Lenguaje, religión y literaura como deformadores de la mujer y la cultura Guatemala: Editorial Universitaria, (1980) (in Spanish)
- De las palabras y la sombra Guatemala: Talleres Gráficas de Serviprensa Centroamericana, (1984) (in Spanish)
- Poetisas desmitificadoras guatemaltecas (antología) Guatemala: Tipografía Nacional, (1984) (in Spanish)
- Las voces silenciadas (poema feminista) Guatemala: Editorial RIN-78, (1985) (in Spanish)
- La poesia del grupo Guatemala: Editorial RIN-78, (1986) (in Spanish)
- Tres rostros de mujer en soledad: monólogos importunos Guatemala: Editorial Artemis-Edinter, (1991) (in Spanish)
- Antología poética Guatemala: Editorial Artemis-Edinter, (1994) (in Spanish)
- Guatemala - arte contemporáneo: (50 años de arte en Guatemala) (with Roberto Cabrera) Guatemala: G & T Foundation, (1997) (in Spanish)
- Helénicas Guatemala: Artemis & Edinter, (1998) (in Spanish)
- Toque de queda : poesía bajo el terror, 1969-1999 Guatemala: Artemis & Edinter, (1999) (in Spanish)
- Mujer, desnudez y palabras Guatemala: Artemis & Edinter, (2002) (in Spanish)
- El amor en la poesía inédita colonial centroamericana: según los Ms. del Archivo General de Centroamérica Guatemala: Universidad Rafael Landívar, (2002) (in Spanish)
- La amada y perseguida Sor Juana Inés de Maldonado y Paz Guatemala: Universidad Rafael Landívar, (2002) (in Spanish)
- Guatemala: una aproximacion a las luchas sociales del 2007 (Simona V Yagenova) Guatemala: Flacso Guatemala (2008) (in Spanish)
- Frágil como el amor Guatemala: Artemis Edinter (2008) (in Spanish)
- Ligera y diáfana: poesía completa Guatemala: Editorial Cultura, (2011) (in Spanish)
- Saint-Exupéry: secretos de amor y de guerra en El principito (with Sonia Asturias de Plihal) Guatemala: Editorial Universitaria (2013 posthumous release) (in Spanish)

=== Plays ===
- Monólogos Inoportunos (1991)
- Tres Rostros de Mujer en Soledad (1991)
