= Marco Antonio Flores =

Guatemalan author, poet, essayist, and journalist

- Born: March 23, 1937
- Died: July 26, 2013 (aged 76)
- Occupations: novelist, poet, journalist

Marco Antonio Flores (March 23, 1937 – July 26, 2013) was a Guatemalan author, poet, essayist, journalist and professor. His published works include the collections of poetry La voz acumulada (1964), Muros de luz (1968), La derrota (1972), Persistencia de la memoria (1992), Crónica de los años de fuego (1993), Un ciego fuego en el alma (1995), Reunión, Poesía completa, Volumen I (1992) and Volumen II (2000) as well as Poesía escogida (1998). His novels include Los compañeros (1976), En el filo (1993), Los muchachos de antes (1996), Las batallas perdidas (1999), La siguamonta (1993) and Cuentos completos (1999).
