= Rafael Landívar University =

Catholic university if Guatemala

Coordinates: 14°35′45″N 90°29′3″W

- Universidad Rafael Landívar
- Coat of arms
- Type: Private, Catholic coeducational higher education institution
- Established: 1961; 65 years ago
- Religious affiliation: Roman Catholic (Jesuit)
- Rector: Fr.Mynor Rodolfo Pinto Solís, S.J.
- Students: 31,176
- Location: Vista Hermosa III, Zone 16 Guatemala City, Guatemala
- Campus: Main Vista Hermosa III in Guatemala City Satellites; Quetzaltenango Campus; La Verapaz Campus; Huehuetenango Campus; Quiche Campus; Zacapa Campus
- Website: principal.url.edu.gt

Rafael Landívar University (Spanish: Universidad Rafael Landívar) is a private Catholic coeducational higher education institution run by the Society of Jesus in Guatemala. It was founded by the Jesuits in 1961. The main campus is in Zone 16 of Guatemala City and is known as Vista Hermosa III. There are satellite campuses in Quetzaltenango, Huehuetenango, Cobán, Zacapa, and other parts of the country. Many recent Guatemalan presidents have studied at the university, including Ramiro de León Carpio, Álvaro Arzú, and Óscar Berger.

== History ==
Rafael Landívar University was inaugurated on 22 January 1962 with 138 students, in the classrooms of Liceo Guatemala, lent to the Jesuits by the Marist Brothers. In July of that year the university moved to a corrugated roof facility in Zone 10 of Guatemala City, before moving to its present location in Zone 16.

Campus Quetzaltenango is in the southwest of the country, 200 km from the capital city, in a large valley surrounded by mountains and volcanoes, 2,334 meters above sea level.

In 1992 the La Verapaz URL campus was opened on the premises of Coban College. In 1997 construction began on the present campus on the grounds of the Craft Education Center, with financial assistance from Spain – Basques, the University of Deusto, and the ALBOAN foundation. The new campus opened on 2 January 2000. In 2005, with funding from KfW German development bank, new classroom buildings and administrative and academic offices were built, along with creation of the Liceo Javier College of La Verapaz. Further support came from the Flemish Universities Network VLIR, Belgium.

The Campus San Roque González de Santa Cruz SJ, Huehuetenango, opened in January 2000 on the premises of La Salle College Diversified, with the Bachelor of Law and Social Sciences, Master in Business Administration, and Bachelor of Social Work, with a technical focus for local development management. It was selected for scholarships by the Konrad Adenauer Stiftung (2003-2007) and KfW Bankengruppe Foundation in a grant-credit project mainly aimed at students of Mayan descent, fostering regional development and teacher training.

Zacapa Regional Headquarters opened in 1977 with technical training in irrigation, union management, and social work. The following year business administration and social work with an emphasis on research and development management were added, along with agricultural sciences with an emphasis on horticulture. It enrolls about 1,500 students from Salama, Jalapa, Jutiapa, and Petén. In 2008 it acquired the status of Regional Campus under the name Regional Campus San Luis Gonzaga, SJ, of Zacapa.

== Social responsibility ==
The university has a Department of Academic Social Responsibility whose function is to be a bridge between social groups in need and entities providing such assistance including disciplines at the university.

== Academics ==
The university has the following schools:

- Architecture and design
- Agricultural and environmental sciences
- Health sciences
- Economics and business
- Law and social sciences
- Political sciences
- Humanities
- Engineering
- Theology

== Activities ==
Activities at the main campus include:

- Chess
- Athletics
- Basketball
- Baseball
- Cheerleading
- Football
- Mountaineering
- Taekwondo
- Table tennis
- Volleyball
- Beach volleyball

== See also ==
- List of Jesuit sites
