= María Currea Manrique =

- Born: 28 May 1890; Bogotá, Colombia
- Died: 23 May 1985 (aged 94); Bogotá, Colombia
- Other names: María Currea de Aya
- Occupations: nurse, writer, suffragist
- Years active: 1930–1970
- Known for: First woman councilor of Bogotá
- Spouse: Ruperto Aya

María Currea Manrique (28 May 1890 – 23 May 1985) was a Colombian feminist, suffragist, politician, nurse and journalist. She was instrumental in pressuring for laws in Colombia which recognized women's right to citizenship, education, and enfranchisement. She was honored as the 1960 "Women of the Americas" by the Organization of American States and received many awards and honors during her lifetime. She was posthumously honored with an award distributed bearing her name each March 8 in honor of International Women's Day to the Colombian woman who has excelled in promoting women's rights in her community.

== Biography ==
María Currea Manrique was born on 28 May 1890 in Bogotá, Colombia to General Aníbal Currea and Hersilia Manrique de Currea. Because of her family's wealth, she traveled widely through Europe and the United States, learning other languages. Since women were forbidden higher education in Colombia at that time, she obtained a nursing degree from Presbyterian Hospital in New York City and then went on to study philosophy and humanities at the University of the Sorbonne in Paris earning a doctorate. Currea married Ruperto Aya, a veteran of the Thousand Days' War, who was instrumental in opening doors for women's rights. In 1930, a group of women, led by Georgina Fletcher attempted to gain citizens' rights for Colombian women. Up to that time women's wages were the property of their husbands, fathers or brothers and she had no guardianship over her children. The women were unsuccessful in 1930, but two years later, Aya introduced Currea to President Enrique Olaya Herrera, whom she and the other women pressured to help change the citizenship laws for women in Colombia. Passage of Law 28 in 1932 recognized women's citizenship for the first time, in Colombia.

The women continued pressing for rights and in 1933 earned the right to attain higher education and to serve in public office by 1936. Currea served as Colombia's delegate to the Inter-American Commission of Women (Spanish: Comisión Interamericana de Mujeres) (CIM) from 1938 to 1948. She lived in the United States between 1937 and 1944. When she was not engaged in business for the CIM, Correa taught Spanish, worked at the Henry Street Settlement Home, wrote for newspapers and performed translating work as well as participating in many speaking engagements both in Colombia and abroad.

She returned to Colombia in 1944, she helped found the suffrage organizations, Unión Femenina de Colombia (Women's Union of Colombia) (UFC) and the Alianza Femenina de Colombia (Women's Alliance of Colombia) with Lucila Rubio de Laverde. Serving as president of the UFC, Currea led the organization to fight not just for enfranchisement of women, but also to address socio-economic inequalities with other women such as María Calderón de Nieto, Teresa Cuervo, Saturia García de Álvarez, María Elena Jiménez de Crovo, María Montaña de Rueda Vargas, María Eugenia Rojas, Rosita Turizo de Trujillo and her daughter Beatriz Aya Currea. For a decade they submitted proposals and projects which were rejected by both liberals and conservatives.

On 25 August 1954 Colombian women won the right to vote and Currea and other suffrage workers immediately started a door to door campaign, registering women to vote. In the first election in which women were allowed to vote, in 1957, nearly two million women participated. Two years later Currea ran for office and was elected as first councilwoman of Bogotá. She was then elected as the first woman to serve as president of the council. She was honored as the 1960 "Woman of the Americas" by the Organization of American States. In 1969, she was elected as mayor of the town of Pacho.

In addition to her political work, Currea founded the School of Nursing of the Red Cross and was active in the Union of Citizens of Colombia, as a Red Cross Volunteer of the Gray Ladies of Bogota and member of Profamilia Board. Currea died on 23 May 1985 in Bogotá, Colombia.

== Awards and honors ==
In addition to her recognition as Woman of the Americas, Currea was twice awarded the Order of Boyaca in 1962 as an officer and in 1978 as a commander. She was awarded the status of officer of the Order of Merit for Distinguished Services from the president of Peru in 1972 and decorated with the Medal of the Colombian Association of the United Nations in 1981. In 2004 a Civil Order of Merit bearing her name was established to be awarded annually on International Women's Day, March 8, "to the woman that at the district level who has excelled in the fields of social, cultural, labor and defense of human rights and whose contribution has led to the development and improvement of the quality of life of the community."
