= Women's suffrage in Colombia =

Aspect of women's rights in Columbia

Women's suffrage in Colombia was introduced in 1954. The reform was introduced during the military dictatorship of Gustavo Rojas Pinilla.

== History ==
The Constitution of the Province of Velez explicitly granted women suffrage in 1853, but the right was rescinded when the Velez Constitution was abolished in 1855. The women's movement in Colombia started late compared to other countries. During the 1930s, a women's movement organized. Women were granted the right to keep their legal majority after marriage in 1932 and attend university in 1934, and feminists started to lobby the Parliament members to lift the issue of women's suffrage. The suffrage movement was mainly focused around the two biggest cities and consisted of well educated elite women from Liberal and Socialist families from the middle and upper classes.

When a female lawyer was rejected from her quest to become a judge in 1944, women organized in the Liberal Union Femenina de Colombia (UFC) in 1944 and the Socialist Alianza Femenina in 1945 to demand women's suffrage. In the public debate, the matter was long a question of only suffrage and not the right to be elected. The Liberal and Socialist party supported the reform. The conservatives initially did not, however the Catholic church came to support it after the Pope had claimed that women, whom he trusted to be conservative, would be a good force in the fight against Communism if granted suffrage.
