= Paca Navas =

Honduran journalist, writer and feminist

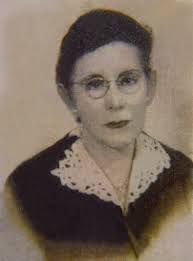
- Born: Francisca Raquel Navas Gardela; March 23, 1883; Juticalpa, Olancho, Honduras
- Died: July 11, 1971 (aged 88); Seattle, King County, Washington
- Other names: Paca Navas de Miralda
- Occupation: Classical coloratura soprano
- Years active: 1935–1960
- Known for: Honduran Feminist Writer
- Notable work: Ritmos Criollos (1947), Barro (1951)
- Spouse: Adolfo Miralda
- Children: Carlos Roberto, Enrique, Alejandro, Valentín, América and Adolfo Miralda Navas

Francisca Raquel Navas Gardela, better known as Paca Navas (1883–1971), was a Honduran journalist, writer and feminist. She founded the first feminist journal in Honduras and was a member of the first suffragette organization. She and her husband spent most of their lives in exile because of their liberal leanings. Her most productive writing period was during her Guatemalan exile from 1945 to 1951.

== Biography ==
Francisca Raquel Navas Gardela better known as Paca Navas was born on March 23, 1883, in Juticalpa, Olancho, Honduras to José María Navas and Francisca Gardela de Navas. In 1900, she married the attorney, intellectual and journalist Adolfo Miralda. Her husband was involved in politics and strongly supported the liberal opposition in his writings, resulting in the family's persecution by the government. Navas' friend and fellow writer Ramón Amaya Amador extended the offer to her to take refuge in La Ceiba and to publish the newspaper Costa Norte.

Thus, they relocated to La Ceiba, where they endured her husband's long political exile. In 1935 to help make ends meet, Navas founded a weekly newspaper La voz de Atlántida, which was a publication focused on Pan-American arts, literature and science. It was considered the first feminist journal in Honduras, covering topics such as aging, domestic abuse, incest, rape, homeless youth, and the subordination of women.

On February 2, 1946, a group of suffragettes organized la Sociedad Femenina Panamericana with president Olimpia Varela y Varela and intellectuals Lucila Gamero de Medina, Argentina Díaz Lozano and Navas. On March 5, 1947, they founded the Comité Femenino Hondureño (affiliated with the Inter-American Commission of Women) with the goal of obtaining political rights for women. They published a magazine, Mujer Americana, which was the third feminist journal of the country, after Navas' Atlántida, and a journal named Atenea by Cristina Hernández de Gomez––begun in El Progreso in 1944. In 1947 Navas represented the Unión Democrática Femenina Hondureña at the Primer Congreso Interamericano de Mujeres in Guatemala City, Guatemala. There she introduced the theme of Political prisoners and exiles of Latin America to the assembly and denounced the forced political exile of 100 Hondurans during the 14 years of the dictatorship of Tiburcio Carías Andino.

At the time of the conference, Navas, having been exiled herself, was living in Guatemala under the protection of the President Juan José Arévalo. She lived in Guatemala from 1945 to 1951. Ramón Amaya Amador sought refuge with her in Guatemala. The Guatemalan sojourn marked her most productive writing period, in part because she could publish her work. In 1947, Navas published a book of poems, Ritmos criollos and followed that with her novel Barro in 1951. Barro had actually been written in 1940, but was barred from publication in Honduras. Barro was set in a newly established workers' town for fruit pickers. It addressed the distress that accompanied their relocation from their traditional villages for better working opportunities and looked at the exploitation of the national territory by foreigners.

She died on July 11, 1971, in Seattle, Washington while visiting her daughter.

== Selected works ==
- Ritmos criollos (1947)
- Barro (1951)
- Mar de fondo
- Campiña olanchana
- Rutas de silencio
- Cámara obscura
- Atraídos

== Barro (1951) ==
One of the best examples of the Criollismo literary movement in Honduras and written during the 1940s. However, it was not able to be published until 1951 in Guatemala during the presidency of Juan José Arévalo, Guatemala's first democratically elected president.

== Atraídos ==
This novel has 17 sections, the two first ones being an introduction and a few words to the reader. The remaining fifteen are suggestive titles regarding different historical moments. In the first chapter, titled 'Oro Verde' (Green Gold), it describes the coast of Atlantis, the landscape, and the lifestyle of Atlantians, highlighting the banana plantations. It is here where Remigio Hernández, an old, widowed man that moves to the coast with his son Leandro to find a better life.

== Note ==
José González is the author of two scholarly works on the history Honduran literature as he references in the blog. The information in his blog, per his acknowledgment corrects an incorrect date in the printed books for Navas' birth. The books are:

- González, José. Cronología de la literatura Hondureña del siglo XX. Honduras: Instituto Hondureño de Antropología e Historia (2008) (in Spanish) (ISBN 978-99926-17-20-5)
- González, José. Diccionario de literatos hondureños Honduras: Editorial Guaymuras (2004) (reprint 2010) (in Spanish) (ISBN 99926-33-27-1)
