= María Teresa Ferrari =

Argentinian physician and university professor

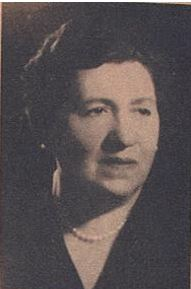
- Born: María Teresa Ferrari Alvarado; 11 October 1887; Buenos Aires, Argentina
- Died: 30 October 1956 (aged 69); Buenos Aires, Argentina
- Other name: María Teresa Ferrari de Gaudino
- Education: National University of Buenos Aires
- Occupations: Educator; physician; women's rights activist
- Years active: 1904–1952

María Teresa Ferrari (11 October 1887 – 30 October 1956) was an Argentine educator, physician, and women's rights activist. She was the first female university professor in Latin America and one of the first women allowed to teach medicine. She was a pioneering researcher in women's health, studying the use of radiation therapy rather than surgery for uterine tumors and developing a vaginoscope that revolutionized women's health care in Brazil. She established the first maternity ward and gynecological services at the Hospital Militar Central of Buenos Aires in 1925, which provided the first incubation services in the country.

Born into a wealthy family whose forebears had been involved in ensuring Argentina's independence from Spain, she was not expected to work outside the home. Yet Ferrari not only chose to have a career but also insisted on participating in the male-dominated medical profession. She first earned a teaching diploma and became a school teacher; then, she earned her medical degree in 1911. After completing her residency, she applied to teach at the university level but instead was offered a teaching post at the School of Midwifery. Outraged, she fought for 13 years against the prejudices that prevented her from advancing in her career. In 1927, Ferrari won her fight and was granted a professorship as an alternate. Finally, in 1939, she was awarded a full professorship.

Ferrari undertook an advanced medical study in Europe and the United States, learning pioneering techniques that she brought back to Argentina. She studied urinary tract monitoring at the Medical Faculty of Paris, earning the first diploma ever given to a woman. She designed a vaginoscope, studied radiation therapy at the Curie Institute, and performed a Caesarean section at Columbia University. She was responsible for bringing these innovations back with her to Argentina and implementing them at the maternity and gynecological unit she established at the Military Hospital. An ardent feminist, she established the Argentina Federation of University Women in 1936 and pushed for recognition of both civil and political rights for women. When the government of Argentina took a conservative turn in the late 1930s, she was pushed out of the hospital and later, in the early 1950s, out of teaching. She died in 1956.

== Early life and education ==
María Teresa Ferrari Alvarado was born on 11 October 1887 in Buenos Aires, Argentina, to Catalina Alvarado and David Ferrari White. Her family was among the founding citizens of Argentina: her paternal great-grandfather, Guillermo Pío White had provided money to assist the United Provinces of the Río de la Plata in defeating the Spanish and her maternal great-grandfather Rudesindo Alvarado had served in the Army of the Andes.

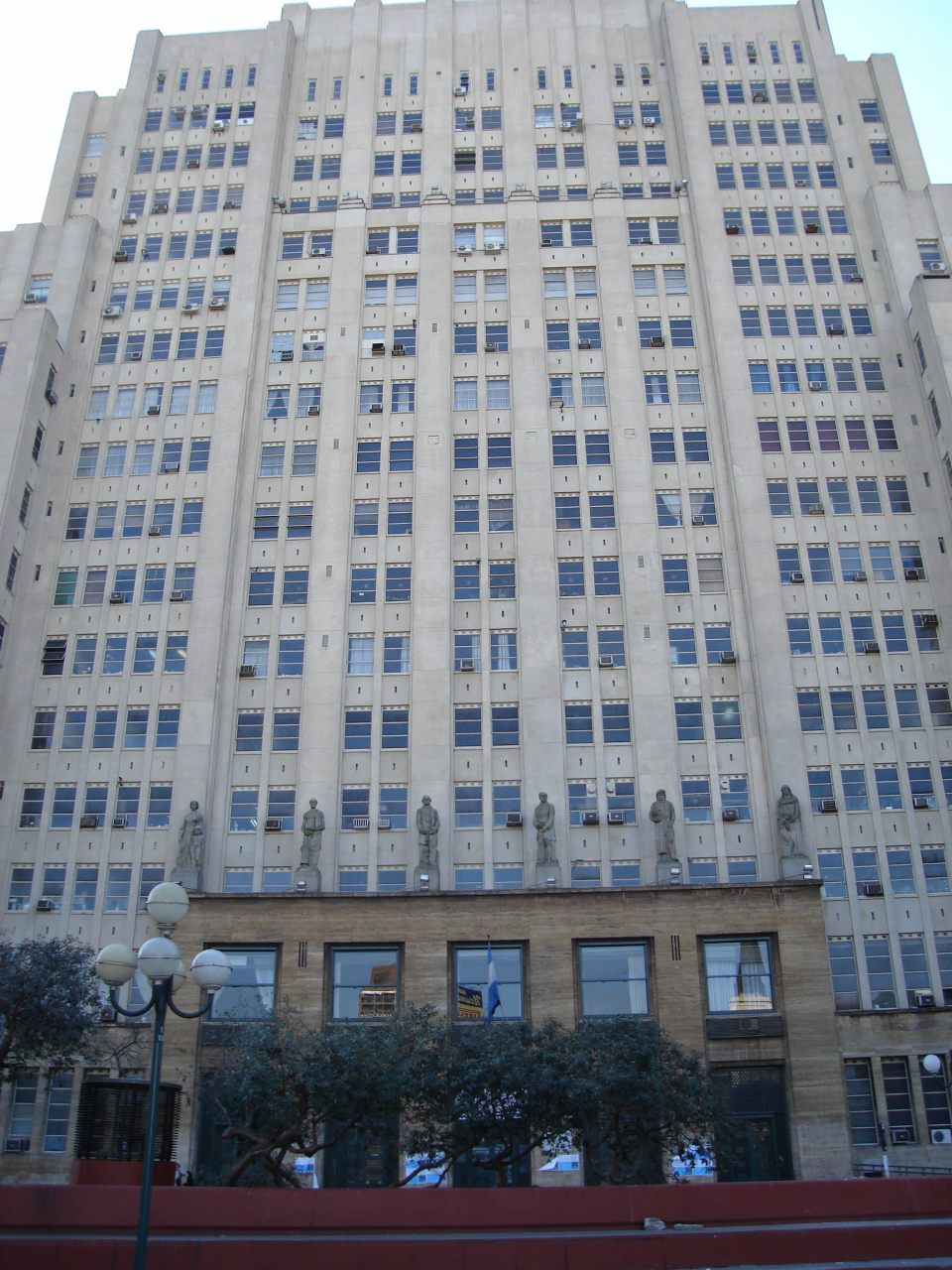
National University of Buenos Aires Faculty of Medicine awarded Ferraro her medical degree in 1911

Ferrari enrolled at the Normal School Nº 1 of Buenos Aires, receiving her teaching certificate in 1903. For a woman of Ferrari's social class, paid work was unusual at the time. It was understood that in cases of financial necessity poor women might nurse or teach, because both were considered charitable, but upper-class women were expected to be no more than wives and mothers, managing their households. Ignoring convention, she embarked on a career in medicine, but also began teaching. Ferrari taught at the Colegio William Morris and the Escuela Nº 3 Bernardino Rivadavia. She had studied psychology in a cutting-edge field known as "experimental psychology" and applied it to her classes, which caused the authorities to launch an investigation into her teaching methods. She was allowed to continue teaching, as her techniques of motivating students and encouraging them to learn proved effective.

In 1904, Ferrari enrolled in medical school at the National University of Buenos Aires while continuing to teach. There had been five other women in the history of Argentina who had earned medical degrees, and although her enrollment was not desired, there was no legal precedent to bar her admittance. In her first year, she was assigned to work as an assistant to Joaquín Llambías in his pathology research, which inspired her continued participation in medical research. Ferrari was awarded her medical degree in 1911.

That same year, she married another graduating physician, Nicolás M. Gaudino. After that, sometimes Ferrari was known as María Teresa Ferrari de Gaudino or simply María Teresa de Gaudino. In 1918 the couple had their only child, Maurio Nicholás Gaudino.

== Career ==
=== Struggle for a university professorship ===
In 1914, Ferrari started work at the obstetrics clinic of the Hospital Ramos Mejía of Buenos Aires. She applied to teach obstetrics at the university, but was turned down. In the proceedings of the Honorable Consejo Directivo (HCD) on 23 June 1915, it was stated: "Despite their qualifications, for physiological and psychological reasons people of the feminine sex do not meet the required conditions to be engaged as professors in the Faculty [of Medicine]". The following year, she was permitted to teach at the School of Midwifery, but this lacked the standing and credentials of a professorship at the university. When an opening for an alternate professorship appeared in 1919, Ferrari reapplied to the university but was met with resistance. The members of the HCD delayed calling together the jurors to fill the vacancy until 1925, altering evidence, ignoring recommendations, and evading a decision. In 1926, she sent a detailed outline of her accomplishments to the committee, stating that she had taught in secondary schools for 20 years and had dedicated 15 years to her field of medicine, and had enrolled in university courses for nine years. One adviser, Dr. Speroni, having read her qualifications, sent a message to the dean imploring that they admit her because she was qualified, had shown dedication, and the school was understaffed. It was not until 1927 that the jurors met, and a thirteen to two vote approved her application for an alternate professorship. The news of the first female university professor in Latin America made headlines throughout Spanish-speaking countries. Newspapers in Argentina, including La Prensa, La Nación, La Razón, and others of the capital, El Censor in Gualeguaychú, Los Andes in Mendoza, Buenos Aires Sud in Florencio Varela, and the Italian La Patria degli Italiani and Spanish El Diario Español carried stories of her triumph.

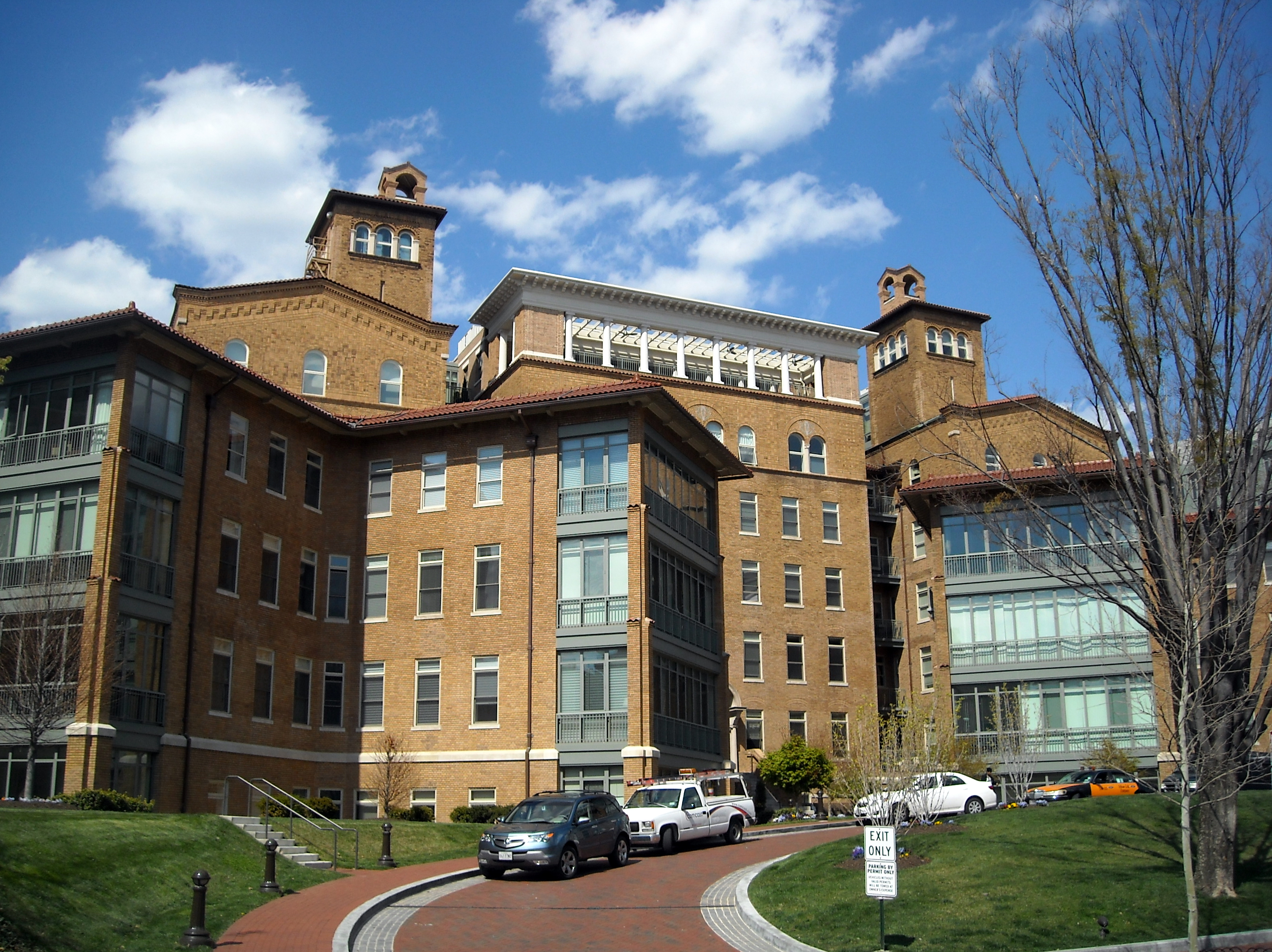
The Columbia Hospital for Women, in Washington, D.C., where Ferrari was an assisting physician

In the interim, Ferrari continued her studies rather than await a decision. Between 1921 and 1923, she visited many European clinics, including facilities in Austria, Belgium, England, France, Germany, and Italy. She was an assisting physician in the clinic of Marie Curie in Paris, as well as, in the Columbia Hospital for Women and Lying-In Asylum in Washington, D.C. The Faculty of Medicine of Paris awarded her the first diploma ever given to a woman for studies in urinary tract monitoring. In 1924, she designed a vaginoscope, which was much easier to sterilize and was more adaptable to multiple specula than previous models. The device significantly improved services available to women in Brazil, and the invention was featured in the articles of the Journal of Gynecology and Obstetrics of Rio de Janeiro. The innovation won the Grand Prize at the 1924 Congreso Hispano Lusitano Americano de Ciencias Médicas held in Seville, Spain.

Ferrari was particularly interested in investigating alternatives to surgery, and her studies on radiation therapy at the Curie Institute became the basis for a 1928 thesis on "Treating Uterine tumors with radiation". In 1925, she was appointed as the Argentine governmental delegate to the First Child Welfare Congress in Geneva. One of the major topics of the conference was the training of midwives in labor and hygiene practices. When her professorship was finally approved, and she returned to Argentina, a celebration was held on 11 August 1927 at the Jockey Club of Buenos Aires, attended by the Minister of the Interior, José P. Tamborini; the director of the Hospital Militar, Alberto Levenne; her research mentor, Joaquín Llambías; and many colleagues, peers, family members, and friends. Ferrari was appointed head of gynecology and maternity at Hospital Militar in Buenos Aires, a post which she held until 1939.

=== Mid-career development ===
Ferrari traveled to Mexico, the United States, and Canada in 1929, studying for eight months and attending conferences. In the United States, she participated in a Caesarean section at Columbia University, becoming the first Argentine to have performed surgery in Washington, D.C. The baby born as a result of the surgery was named "Argentina". In 1930, she served as the Argentine delegate for the VII Medical Congress of Latin America held in Mexico and presided over the first general session. She presented three papers; one addressed uterine tumors, and the other two were about syphilis. She was also the delegate for the 2nd Congress of the Pan-American Medical Association in Panama. Between 1930 and 1932 she returned to the United States for additional studies, which focused on colibacillosis, sepsis, puerperal infections, and investigating whether vaccines could be developed to prevent the development of conditions resulting from childbirth or miscarriage.

In 1936, Ferrari founded the Argentina Federation of University Women (FAMU) to improve the social and legal standing of women and, specifically, open educational doors. She recruited professional women, including physicians, dentists, and attorneys and she organized scientific and cultural discussions and seminars. FAMU had regular French, German, physical education, and mathematics courses, which it offered to its nearly 100 members. The political and civic limitations that threatened the careers of these women was a concern, and the organization's official statement supported enfranchisement as "not a mere political aspiration for women, but a real right acquired by suffering, work, and deprivation experienced by women..." In 1938, the Argentine organization joined the International Federation of University Women, which had served as Ferrari's inspiration.

=== Military hospital and later career ===
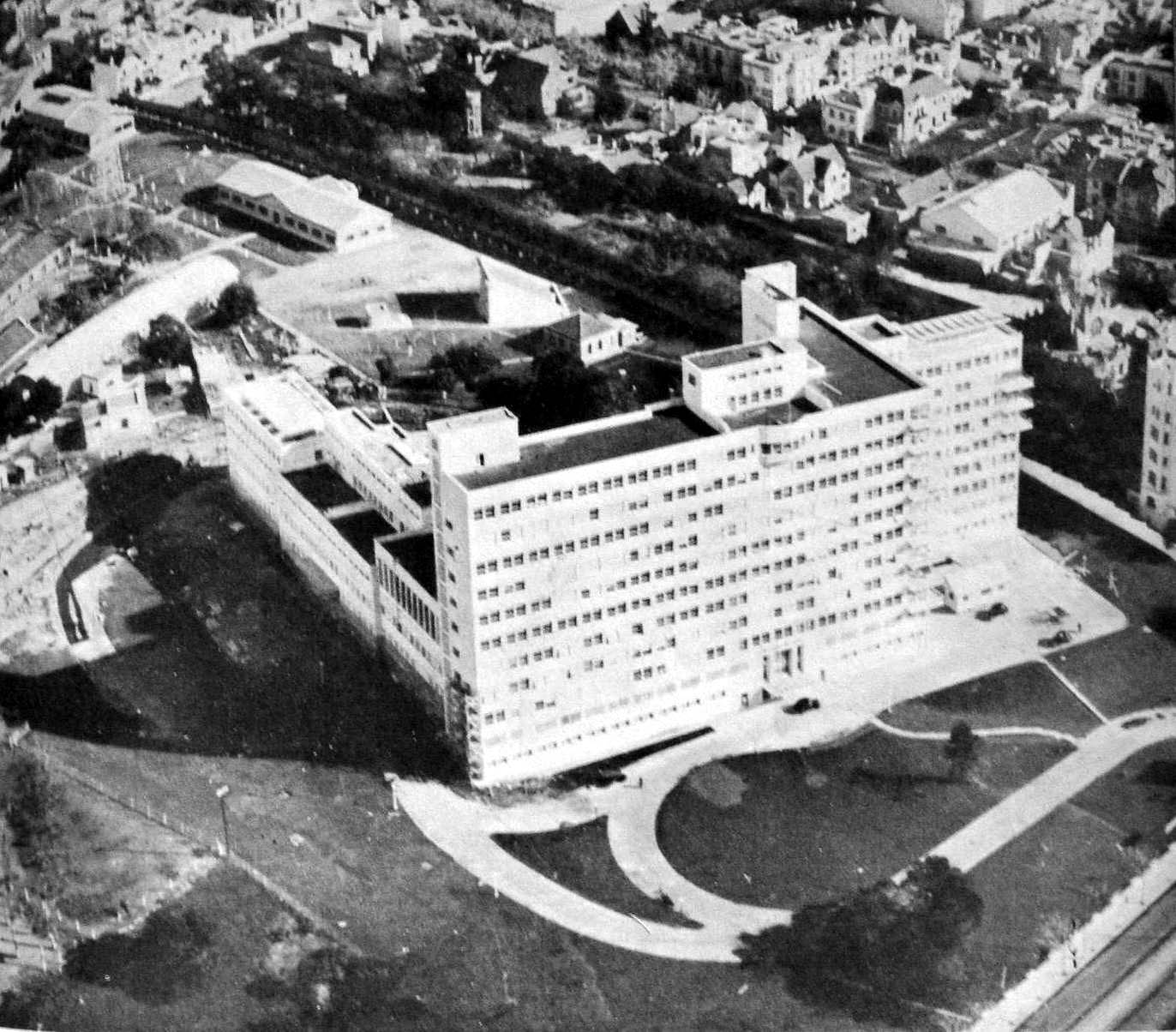
Hospital Militar Central

In 1925, Ferrari was called to assist a military wife during childbirth at the Hospital Militar Central of Buenos Aires, which had no gynecological unit. After she proposed that one be developed, Ferrari started the facility with one bed and donated equipment and supplies. In June of that year, the military gazette began advertising that gynecological services were available from Mondays to Fridays at the hospital. As military wives became aware of the services, the growth was exponential. Within five years, Ferrari had expanded the service to two floors that housed a maternity unit with two delivery rooms, their own sterilization facility, a recovery unit, and forty beds in private rooms. She also developed a small sealed room with purified air and an incubator, the first of its kind in Argentina. Ferrari brought the techniques she had learned abroad to Argentina. Although radiology had been performed in other parts of the world for decades, there was resistance to implementing it by professionals with no experience. Ferrari insisted it should be introduced and fought against the previous practice of surgical solutions for all cases, advocating that surgery only be used when absolutely necessary. A commemoration for the tenth anniversary of the maternity unit was attended by the Minister of War, the Director General of Health, the Hospital Director, and other senior officials, as well as by children born during the previous ten years, together with their families. A commission of the Marine wives who had received service from Ferrari's unit made a substantial donation. Despite her success, the atmosphere at the hospital remained hostile.

=== Political shift to conservatism disrupts career ===
Following the 1930 coup d'état of José Félix Uriburu with the country's shift to a more conservative stance during the Infamous Decade, Ferrari ultimately was forced to leave the hospital in 1939.

Ferrari's disappointment at having to leave the hospital was offset in 1939, when she was finally made a full professor, receiving the title "Profesor Extraordinario" of the Obstetrics Faculty. Throughout the 1940s she continued her education, traveling to Cuba, New York, Pennsylvania, Peru, and Puerto Rico, publishing her research in a variety of journals. In 1946 she resigned as president of the Argentina Federation of University Women, but continued to represent the organization at conferences, such as the Primer Congreso Interamericano de Mujeres, which she attended in Guatemala City in 1947.

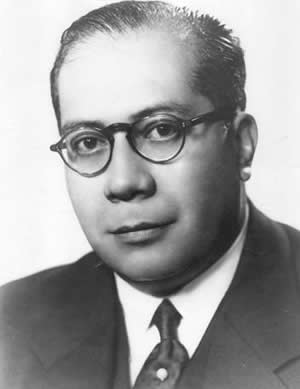
Ramon Carrillo

After 43 years of teaching at Normal School Nº 3, Ferrari was forced into retirement by the Ministry of Education because she refused to participate in a political contribution fund. She also was asked to resign from her position as professor of psychology at Colegio William Morris. In 1952, rather than join the Peronista supporters and betray her ideals, she took full retirement. When elected, Perón had instituted a massive overhaul of the health system of Argentina. He appointed Ramón Carrillo as his health minister. In the beginning, hospital beds were added, vaccination programs were instituted, a campaign against malaria was launched, and other improvements were made. However, by the early 1950s, it was clear that policies were unevenly applied, implementation was erratic, and political cronyism was working against providing health services for those most in need. Two years after Ferrari resigned, Carrillo resigned, disillusioned with the Perón administration.

== National professional affiliations ==
Ferrari was a full member of the Argentine Association of Surgery, the Argentine Medical Association, and the Argentine Society of Obstetrics and Gynecology of Buenos Aires. She also was a correspondent member of the Society of Medicine and Surgery of Rio de Janeiro.

Ferrari died on 30 October 1956 in Buenos Aires.

== Selected works ==
Ferrari's works were all in French or Spanish and outlined her research on various scientific and gynecological topics. They included the following:

- "Contribución al estudio de la medicación hipofisiaria en Obstetricia" (in Spanish). Buenos Aires: Facultad de Ciencias Médicas. 1912.
- "Infecciones puerperales. Tratadas por vacunas Coli" (in Spanish). Buenos Aires: Anales de Sociedad de Obstetricia y Ginecología. 1914.
- "Vagido Uterino" (in Spanish). Buenos Aires: Revista Argentina Obstetricia y Ginecología. 1917.
- "Tumores del ovario complicando el embarazo, el parto y el puerperio" (in Spanish). Buenos Aires: La Semana Médica. 1921.
- "Siphilis et Mortalité" (in Spanish). Buenos Aires: La Semana Médica. 1922.
- "Traitement de la sténose du col de l'uterus par Tige Iribarbe" (in French). Paris: Boletín de la Société de Gynecolegie et d’Obstetrique de París. 1923.
- "Vaginoscopio" (in Spanish). Buenos Aires: La Semana Médica. 1924.
- "Tratamiento de los Fibromas Uterinos por Radio". Las Ciencias Buenos Aires (in Spanish). Buenos Aires: AG Bufarrini. 1928.
- "El Radio en la Fibromatosis Uterina" (in Spanish). Buenos Aires: La Semana Médica. 1932.
- "El Radio frente a la cirugía en el Tratamiento de los Fibromas uterinos". Acción Médica (in Spanish). 22. Buenos Aires. 1939.
- "Mme. Curie, la Radioactividad y sus proyecciones en a Física y la Terapéutica". Vox Médica (in Spanish). 10. Buenos Aires. 1941.
- "570 casos de Fibromas Uterins traités avec succés par la Curieteherapie" (in French). Paris: Revue Gynecolegie et Ostetrique. 1947.
- "Fibromas Uterins traits avec success par la Curietherapie" (in French). Praxis: Journal Suisse de Medicine. 1948.
- "Tratamiento de la Fibromatosis Uterina por el Radio" (in Spanish). 7. Madrid: Toco Ginecología Práctica. 1948.

== See also ==
- Timeline of women in science
