= Carmen Sánchez de Bustamante Calvo =

Bolivian woman's rights advocate (b. 1891)

Carmen Sánchez-Bustamante y Calvo
- Born: 1891; La Paz, Bolivia
- Died: Unknown; La Paz, Bolivia
- Other names: Carmen Sánchez-Bustamante de Sánchez de Lozada; Carmen de Sánchez de Lozada
- Occupation: Women's Rights Advocate
- Years active: 1940–?

Carmen Sánchez-Bustamante y Calvo was a Bolivian woman's rights advocate and the first Bolivian woman to serve on the OAS's Inter-American Commission of Women. She also served on the organizing committee from the Women's International League for Peace and Freedom for the Primer Congreso Interamericano de Mujeres. A Bolivian women's rights organization, the Carmen Sánchez-Bustamante Foundation was named in recognition of her work to promote women's rights.

== Biography ==
Carmen Sánchez-Bustamante y Calvo was born in 1891 in La Paz, Bolivia to Daniel Sánchez-Bustamante y Vásquez-Bru and Carmen Calvo Molina.

In 1929, Sánchez-Bustamante married Enrique Sánchez de Lozada e Irigoyen and had their first child Gonzalo Sánchez de Lozada y Sánchez-Bustamante in Bolivia in 1930, before her husband accepted a diplomatic posting to Washington, DC. Arriving in 1931 to accept the post as First Secretary, and at times chargé d'affaires, the family lived in Washington until 1936. In 1937, the family relocated to Massachusetts, where Sánchez de Lozada accepted a posting as a professor of romance languages at Williams College in Williamstown until 1941. The family then moved back to Washington, where during the war, Sánchez de Lozada was an adviser to Nelson Rockefeller who was Coordinator of Inter-American Affairs and in 1943 was appointed as "special confidential agent" of the Gualberto Villarroel regime after his coup d'état.

In the 1940s, Sánchez de Bustamante was selected as Bolivia's first representative to the Organization of American States' Inter-American Commission of Women (CIM). She was still serving in that capacity in 1947 and that same year she served on the organizing committee of the Women's International League for Peace and Freedom (WILPF)'s call for the Primer Congreso Interamericano de Mujeres held in Guatemala City, Guatemala. At the close of the conference, she was acknowledged as one of the highest ranking women of the conference. After the conference, Heloise Brainerd, Sánchez de Bustamante, and Annalee Stewart worked to try to organize a follow-up conference, but reported scant progress and the need to reorganize, as well as the closure of the Guatemalan sponsor of the event. She is also remembered for her return to Bolivia in 1946 where she inspired mob of feminists which contributed to the overthrow of president Gualberto Villarroel.

She was honored in 1988 on the 60th anniversary of the CIM for her work for women's rights throughout the Americas. The Carmen Sánchez-Bustamante Foundation (also known as the Carmen Foundation) was named in her honor. The foundation's mission is to "promote equity and social inclusion" in Bolivia.
