= Maria Ferrari =

Maria Ferrari may refer to:

- María Teresa Ferrari (1887–1956), Argentine educator, medical doctor, and women's rights activist
- María Paz Ferrari (born 1973) a field hockey player from Argentina
- Nino Agostino Arturo Maria Ferrari, full name of Nino Ferrer (1934–1998), Italian-French singer, author and songwriter
- Ines Maria Ferraris (1882–1971), Italian operatic soprano and pianist
- Maria Teresa Ferrari de Miramar (also Sanchez), see Aleister Crowley

== See also ==
- Marina Ferrari (born 1973), French politician
