= Pediatric gynecology =

Medical practice dealing with children

- System: Female reproductive system
- Significant diseases: Gynecological cancers, menstrual bleeding
- Specialist: Pediatric gynecologist

Pediatric gynecology or paediatric gynaecology (Note: See American and British English spelling differences. Gynecology is the American spelling, but it is also common in international contexts, e.g. International Federation of Gynecology and Obstetrics and International Society of Ultrasound in Obstetrics and Gynecology.) is the medical practice dealing with the health of the vagina, vulva, uterus, and ovaries of infants, children, and adolescents. Its counterpart is pediatric andrology, which deals with medical issues specific to the penis and testes.

== Etymology ==
The word gynecology comes from the oblique stem (γυναικ-) of the Greek word γυνή (gyne) meaning 'woman', and -logia meaning 'study'.

== Examination ==
Assessment of the external genitalia and breast development are often part of routine physical examinations. Physicians also can advise pediatric gynecology patients on anatomy and sexuality. Assessment can include an examination of the vulva, and rarely involve the introduction of instruments into the vagina. Many young patients prefer to have a parent, usually a mother, in the examination room. Two main positions for examination can be used, depending on the patient's preference and the specific examination being performed, including the frog-leg position (with the head of the examination table raised or lowered), the lithotomy position with stirrups, or either of these with a parent holding the child. A hand mirror can be provided to allow the child to participate and to educate the child about their anatomy. Anesthesia or sedation should only be used when the examination is being performed in an emergency situation; otherwise it is recommended that the clinician see a reluctant child with a gynecologic complaint over several visits to foster trust.

Examination of the external genitalia should be done by gently moving the labia minora to either side, or gently moving them towards the anterior (front) side of the body to expose the vaginal introitus. Routine physical examinations by a pediatrician typically include a visual examination of breasts and vulva; more extensive examinations may be performed by a pediatrician in response to a specific complaint. Rarely, an internal examination may be necessary, and may need to be conducted under anesthesia. Cases where an internal examination may be necessary include vaginal bleeding, retained foreign bodies, and potential tumors.

== Diseases and conditions ==
There are a number of common pediatric gynecologic conditions and complaints, both pathological and benign.

=== Intersex conditions ===
A pediatric gynecologist can care for children with a number of intersex conditions, including Swyer syndrome (46,XY karyotype).

=== Amenorrhea ===
Amenorrhea, the lack of a menstrual period, may indicate a congenital anomaly of the reproductive tract. Typically obvious on an external visual examination of a child's vulva, imperforate hymen is the presence of a hymen that completely covers the introitus. Other anomalies that can cause amenorrhea include Müllerian agenesis affecting the uterus, cervix, and/or vagina; obstructed uterine horn; OHVIRA syndrome; and the presence of a transverse vaginal septum. OHVIRA and uterine horn obstruction can also cause increasingly painful menstruation (dysmenorrhea) in the months following menarche.

=== Abnormal vaginal bleeding ===
Vaginal bleeding not associated with menarche may be cause for concern in a child. In the first few days of life, some amount of vaginal bleeding is normal, prompted by the drop in transplacental hormones. Causes of vaginal bleeding in children include trauma, condyloma acuminata, lichen sclerosus, vulvovaginitis, tumors, urethral prolapse, precocious puberty, exogenous hormone exposure, and retained foreign body. Most causes can be diagnosed with a visual examination of the vulva and a careful medical history, but some may require vaginoscopy or a speculum exam.

=== Vulvovaginitis ===
Vulvovaginitis in children may be "nonspecific", or caused by irritation with no known infectious cause, or infectious, caused by a pathogenic organism. Nonspecific vulvovaginitis may be triggered by fecal contamination, sexual abuse, chronic diseases, foreign bodies, nonestrogenized epithelium, chemical irritants, eczema, seborrhea, or immunodeficiency. It is treated with topical steroids; antibiotics may be given in cases where itching has resulted in a secondary infection.

Infectious vulvovaginitis can be caused by group A beta-hemolytic Streptococcus (7–20% of cases), Haemophilus influenzae, Streptococcus pneumoniae, Staphylococcus aureus, Shigella, Yersinia, or common STI organisms (Neisseria gonorrhoeae, Chlamydia trachomatis, Trichomonas vaginalis, herpes simplex virus, and human papillomavirus). Symptoms and treatment of infectious vulvovaginitis vary depending on the organism causing it. Shigella infections of the reproductive tract usually coexist with infectious of the gastrointestinal tract and cause mucous, purulent discharge. They are treated with trimethoprim-sulfamethoxazole. Streptococcus infections cause similar symptoms to nonspecific vulvovaginitis and are treated with amoxicillin. STI-associated vulvovaginitis may be caused by sexual abuse or vertical transmission, and are treated and diagnosed like adult infections.

=== Vulvitis ===
Vulvitis, inflammation of the vulva, can have a variety of etiologies in children and adolescents, including allergic dermatitis, contact dermatitis, lichen sclerosus, and infections with bacteria, fungi, and parasites. Dermatitis in infants is commonly caused by a soiled diaper being left on for an extended period of time. Increasing the frequency of diaper changes and topical application of emollients are sufficient to resolve most cases. Dermatitis of the vulva in older children is usually caused by exposure to an irritant (e.g. scented products that come into contact with the vulva, laundry detergent, soaps, etc.) and is treated with preventing exposure and encouraging sitz baths with baking soda as the vulvar skin heals. Other treatment options for vulvar dermatitis include oral hydroxyzine hydrochloride or topical hydrocortisone.

Lichen sclerosus is another common cause of vulvitis in children, and it often affects an hourglass or figure eight-shaped area of skin around the anus and vulva. Symptoms of a mild case include skin fissures, loss of skin pigment (hypopigmentation), skin atrophy, a parchment-like texture to the skin, dysuria, itching, discomfort, and excoriation. In more severe cases, the vulva may become discolored, developing dark purple bruising (ecchymosis), bleeding, scarring, attenuation of the labia minora, and fissures and bleeding affecting the posterior fourchette. Its cause is unknown, but likely genetic or autoimmune, and it is unconnected to malignancy in children. If the skin changes are not obvious on visual inspection, a biopsy of the skin may be performed to acquire an exact diagnosis. Treatment for vulvar lichen sclerosis may consist of topical hydrocortisone in mild cases, or stronger topical steroids (e.g. clobetasol propionate). Preliminary studies show that 75% of cases do not resolve with puberty.

Organisms responsible for vulvitis in children include pinworms (Enterobius vermicularis), Candida yeast, and group A hemolytic Streptococcus. Though pinworms mainly affect the perianal area, they can cause itching and irritation to the vulva as well. Pinworms are treated with albendazole. Vulvar Candida infections are uncommon in children, and generally occur in infants after antibiotic therapy, and in children with diabetes or immunodeficiency. Candida infections cause a red raised vulvar rash with satellite lesions and clear borders, and are diagnosed by microscopically examining a sample treated with potassium hydroxide for hyphae. They are treated with topical butoconazole, clotrimazole, or miconazole. Streptococcus infections are characterized by a dark red discoloration of the vulva and introitus, and cause pain, itching, bleeding, and dysuria. They are treated with antibiotics.

=== Breast abnormalities ===
An abnormal mass in a child's developing breast or early development of breast tissue may prompt concern. Neonates can have small breast buds at birth or white discharge (witches' milk), caused by exposure to transplacental hormones in utero. These phenomena are not pathological and typically disappear over the first weeks to months of life. Accessory nipples (polythelia) occur in 1% of children along the embryonic milk line and are benign in most cases. They may be removed surgically if they develop glandular tissue and cause pain, have discharge, or develop fibroadenomas.

Some asymmetric breast growth is normal in early adolescence, but asymmetry may be caused by trauma, fibroadenoma, or cysts. Most non-pathological asymmetry resolves spontaneously by the end of puberty; if it does not, surgical intervention is possible. Some adolescents may develop tuberous breasts, wherein the normal fat and glandular tissue grows directly away from the chest due to the adherence of breast fascia to the underlying muscle. Hormone replacement therapy or oral contraceptives are used to encourage outward growth of the breast base. Hypertrophy of breast tissue may or may not be a problem for an individual adolescent; back pain, kyphosis, shoulder pain, and psychologic distress may be cause for breast reduction surgery after development is complete. On the opposite end of the spectrum, breast tissue may not develop for a variety of reasons. The most common cause is low levels of estrogen (hypoestrogenism), which may result from chronic disease, radiation or chemotherapy, Poland syndrome, extreme physical activity, or gonadal dysgenesis. Amastia, which occurs when a child is born without glandular breast tissue, is rare.

More than 99% of breast masses in children and adolescents are benign, and include fibrocystic breast changes, cysts, fibroadenomas, lymph nodes, and abscesses. Fibroadenomas make up 68–94% of all pediatric breast masses, and can be simply observed to ensure their stability, or excised if they are symptomatic, large, and/or enlarging.

==== Mastitis ====
Mastitis, infection of the breast tissue, occurs most commonly in neonates and children over 10, though it is rare overall in children. Most often caused by S. aureus, mastitis in children is caused by a variety of factors, including trauma, nipple piercing, lactation and/or pregnancy, or shaving periareolar hair. The development of abscesses from mastitis is more common in children than in adults.

=== Precocious puberty ===
Precocious puberty occurs when children younger than 8 experience changes indicative of puberty, including development of breast buds (thelarche), pubic hair, and a growth spurt. Thelarche before 8 is considered abnormal. Though not all precocious puberty has a specific pathological cause, it may indicate a serious medical problem and is thoroughly evaluated. In most cases, the cause of precocious puberty cannot be identified. "Central precocious puberty" or "true precocious puberty" stems from early activation of the hypothalamic-pituitary-ovarian axis. It occurs in 1 in 5,000 to 1 in 10,000 people and can be caused by a lesion in the central nervous system or have no apparent cause. "Peripheral precocious puberty" or "GnRH independent precocious puberty" does not involve the hypothalamic-pituitary-ovarian axis, instead, it involves other sources of hormones. The causes of peripheral precocious puberty include adrenal or ovarian tumors, congenital adrenal hyperplasia, and exogenous hormone exposure.

==== Premature thelarche ====
Premature development of breast tissue is not necessarily indicative of precocious puberty; if it occurs without a corresponding growth spurt and with normal bone age, it does not represent pubertal development. It is associated with low birthweight and slightly elevated estradiol. Most premature breast development regresses spontaneously, and monitoring for other signs of precocious puberty is usually the only necessary management.

=== Labial adhesion ===
Labial adhesion is a fusion between the labia minora that may be small and posterior – and generally asymptomatic – or may involve the entire labia and seal off the vaginal introitus entirely. It is generally only treated when it causes urinary symptoms; otherwise it normally resolves when the vaginal mucosa becomes estrogenized at the onset of puberty. Treatments include topical application of estrogens or betamethasone with gentle traction on the labia, followed with vitamin A, vitamin D, and/or petroleum jelly to prevent re-adhesion. The labia may be separated manually with local anesthesia or surgically under general anesthesia (in a procedure called introitoplasty) if topical treatment is unsuccessful. This is followed with estrogen treatment to prevent recurrence.

=== Ovarian mass ===
Ovarian masses in children are typically cystic, but 1% are malignant ovarian cancers. 30–70% of neonates with ovaries have cysts; they are caused by transplacental hormones in utero or by the postnatal spike in gonadotropins. Neonatal ovarian cysts usually affect one ovary, do not cause symptoms, are classed as simple, and disappear by the age of 4 months. In rare cases, neonatal ovarian cysts may result in ovarian torsion, autoamputation of the ovary, intracystic hemorrhage, rupture, and compression of surrounding organs. Cysts smaller than 5 centimeters in diameter may be monitored with ultrasonography; larger cysts are more likely to cause complications are either drained by percutaneous aspiration or surgically removed.

In older children, cystic ovarian masses may cause a visible change in body shape, chronic pain, and precocious puberty; complications with these cysts cause acute, severe abdominal pain. Transabdominal ultrasonography can be used to diagnose and image pediatric ovarian cysts, because transvaginal probes are not recommended for use in children. Complex cysts are likely to be benign mature cystic teratoma, whereas the most common malignancies in this age group are malignant germ cell tumors and epithelial ovarian cancer.

== Complaints ==
Common pediatric gynecologic complaints include vaginal discharge, pre-menarche bleeding, itching, and accounts of sexual abuse.

A mass in the inguinal area may be a hernia or may be a testis in an intersex child.

== Prepubertal anatomy ==
The vaginal mucosa in prepubertal children is markedly different from that of postpubertal adolescents; it is thin and red colored.

In neonates, the uterus is spade-shaped, contains fluid 25% of the time, and often has a visible endometrial stripe. This is normal and due to the hormones that have passed to the neonate across the placenta. The shape of the uterus is influenced by the anteroposterior diameter of the cervix, which is larger than the fundus at this age. By premenarchal age, the uterus is tubular, because the fundus and the cervix are the same diameter. The ovaries are small in neonates and grow throughout childhood to a volume of 2–4 cubic centimeters. On vaginoscopy, the prepubertal cervix is usually level with the proximal vagina.

== Puberty ==
During puberty, the vaginal mucosa becomes estrogenized and becomes a dull pink color and gains moisture. Secondary sex characteristics develop under the influence of estrogen on the hypothalamic-pituitary-gonadal axis, typically between the ages of 8 and 13. These characteristics include breast buds, pubic hair, and accelerated growth. Higher body mass index is correlated with earlier puberty.
