= Lucila Gamero de Medina =

Honduran novelist (1873–1964)

Lucila Gamero de la Medina
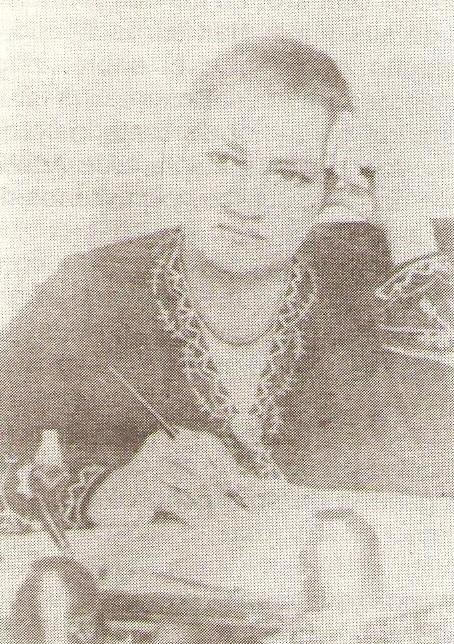
- Born: 12 June 1873; Danlí, Honduras
- Died: 23 January 1964 (aged 90); Danlí, Honduras
- Other name: Lucila Gamero Moncada
- Occupations: physician, writer, feminist
- Known for: publishing the first novel of Honduras

Lucila Gamero de Medina (12 June 1873 – 23 January 1964) was a Honduran romantic novelist. She was the first woman in Honduras to produce literary work and in Central America to publish novels. Critic and writer Luis Marín Otero called her "the grand dame of Honduran letters". She was trained as a physician and pharmacist, and though prevented from studying at the university, was awarded a diploma of Medicine and Surgery from the dean of the Faculty of Medicine. She headed a hospital and served as a health inspector in her native department. In addition to her medical and literary efforts, Gamero was an active feminist and suffragette, attending conferences and participating in the founding of the Comité Femenino Hondureño.

== Biography ==
Lucila Gamero Moncada was born on 12 June 1873 in Danlí, Honduras to Manuel Gamero and Camila Moncada. She completed her secondary education at the Colegio La Educación and wanted to study medicine abroad but was prevented from doing so. Her father, who was a doctor, taught her medicine and she practiced as both a physician and pharmacist, taking over her father's clinic and running the family pharmacy. She later received a diploma of Medicine and Surgery from the dean of the Faculty of Medicine, Dr. Manuel G. Zuniga. In 1924, she was appointed to head the Hospital de Sangre in Danlí and from 1930 served as the health inspector of the El Paraíso Department.

She began writing as a child, publishing in the magazine La Juventud Hondureña (Honduran Youth) from as early as 1891. Gamero authored the first novel ever published by a Honduran woman, Amalia Montiel, which was released in 1892, as serialized chapters in the weekly newspaper El Pensamiento, directed by Froylan Turcios. Her second novel, Adriana and Margarita (1893), was the first novel published in Honduras.

Her literary output was an example of the late-Romantic period of Latin American literature. Love and family are major themes that occupy most of her narratives. Her best-known novel is Blanca Olmedo, a love story that directly criticizes the Honduran church and establishment at the time, an unprecedented step in Honduran literature. Blanca Olmedo is considered to be one of the most important Honduran novels of the early twentieth century. Gamero de Medina's novels are a staple of the literature curriculum in high schools and universities in Honduras and she is considered one of the most important literary figures of Central America in the late nineteenth century. Gamero was a member of numerous literary associations of Central America, the Honduran Academy of Language, and wrote her autobiography in 1949.

Gamero de Medina was also involved in the Honduran fight for women's right to vote. In 1924 she served as Honduras' delegate to the Second Pan-American Women's Conference. On 2 February 1946 a group of suffragette's organized la Sociedad Femenina Panamericana with president Olimpia Varela y Varela and intellectuals Gamero de Medina, Argentina Díaz Lozano and Paca Navas. On 5 March 1947, they founded the Comité Femenino Hondureño (affiliated with the Inter-American Commission of Women) with the goal of obtaining political rights for women. They published a magazine Mujer Americana, which was the third feminist journal of the country, after Navas' Atlántida and a journal named Atenea by Cristina Hernández de Gómez began in El Progreso in 1944.

Gamero married Gilberto Medina, and they had two children, Aída Cora Medina and Gilberto Gustavo Medina. She died on 23 January 1964 in Danlí.

== Notable works ==
In 1997, the UNAH Editorial Universitaria published a complete volume of her short stories. Other works include:

- Amelia Montiel (1892)
- Adriana y Margarita (1893)
- Páginas del Corazón (1897)
- Blanca Olmedo (1908)
- Betina (1941)
- Aída (1948)
- Amor Exótico (1954)
- La Secretaria (1954)
- El Dolor de Amar (1955)
