= Lucila Rubio de Laverde =

- Lucila Rubio during her 1944 testimony for the right to vote
- Born: 1908; Facatativá, Colombia
- Died: 1970 (aged 61–62)
- Other names: Lucila Rubio, Lucila Rubio Angulo de Laverde
- Occupations: Educator, Suffragist
- Spouse: Eduardo Laverde

Lucila Rubio de Laverde (1908–1970) was a Colombian socialist and one of the leading suffragettes in her country. She was also a teacher and the first woman to present a demand for the vote to the President of Colombia.

== Biography ==
Rubio was born in Facatativá, Colombia. She began her activism as early as the 1930s, when she fought for the economic rights of women. She pushed for legislation granting pre-nuptial agreements, was a proponent of co-habitation and she spoke against the Church's treatment of women.

By the 1940s, Rubio had become one of the leaders of Colombia's women's rights movement and a most important suffragette. She was one of the founders of The Unión Femenina de Colombia (Women's Union of Colombia) (UFC), created in Bogota in 1944. The UFC was one of the most important women's organizations during this time. It spread to other cities and promoted voting rights, literacy of women, and rights of citizens. Rubio de Laverde served as president of the organization and was also president of the Alianza Femenina de Colombia (Women's Alliance of Colombia), founded the same year. In 1944, the UFC collected more than 500 signatures pressing for the vote and Rubio de Laverde presented them to President Alfonso López Pumarejo, demanding women's right to vote.

She wrote for Agitación Femenina from 1944 to 1946. Rubio de Laverde wrote about social problems in Colombia from a feminist perspective, collaborating in newspapers and magazines such as Pax et Libertas, Verdad and Dominical. She founded the College Froevel, which operated for eight years, and gave lectures at the School of Social Service, the Women's Institute of the Free University and the Colegio Mayor de Cundinamarca.

In Colombia, she attended both the 1945 suffrage conference and the 1946 conference where she warned that women should not limit themselves to their homes but should be fully participating citizens. She also attended the Primer Congreso Interamericano de Mujeres held in Guatemala City, Guatemala in 1947 and presided over the final session where the resolutions were drafted. She attended the Second Congress of Women of the Americas, and attended the International Council of Women's 1960 meeting in Warsaw. In 1962, she attended the 15th Congress of the League of Peace and Freedom held in San Francisco and participated in the debates on nuclear testing. In 1963, Rubio attended the pilgrimage Women for Peace in Rome and Geneva.

Rubio married Eduardo Laverde, a "man of letters".

== Bibliography ==
- Pinzón Estrada, Sandra Carolina (24 June 2019). Escritoras de Prensa durante los Años Cuarenta ¿Un despertar que quedó oculto? [Writers of the Press during the 1940s An awakening that was hidden?] (Thesis) (in Spanish).
