= Heloise Brainerd =

American activist

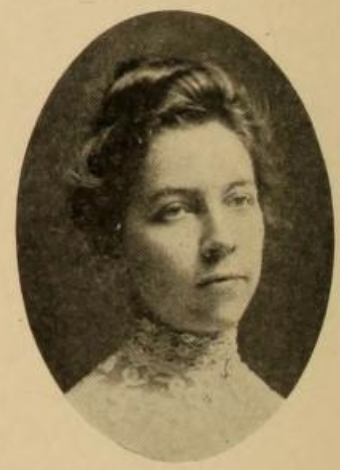
- Heloise Brainerd, from the 1904 yearbook of Smith College
- Born: 30 April 1881; Wallingford, Vermont
- Died: 16 February 1969 (aged 87); Freeport, Illinois
- Occupations: internationalist, pacificst
- Years active: 1909–1958

Heloise Brainerd (30 April 1881 – 16 February 1969) was an American activist and a proponent of Latin American women's participation in the peace movement. Brainerd worked at the Pan American Union from 1909 to 1935 and then Women's International League for Peace and Freedom's US section. She received several international awards, including the Medal of Public Instruction from Venezuela and the Order of Merit from Ecuador.

== Early life and education ==
Heloise Brainerd was born on 30 April 1881 in Wallingford, Vermont. After graduating from Smith College in 1904, she moved to Mexico City, where she worked as a secretary in a law firm and learned Spanish.

== Career ==
In 1909, Brainerd began working for the Pan American Union as a private secretary to the assistant director. She worked her way up to the head of the Educational Division and in 1929, when the Division of Intellectual Cooperation was created, she became its director. The new unit was responsible for promoting international cooperation and education. On 22 June 1935, Brainerd retired from the Pan American Union and was immediately recruited by the Women's International League for Peace and Freedom (WILPF) as a chair for the US Section. She was a long time member of WILPF and would be the first Spanish speaking delegate the US had ever had.

Brainerd's hiring changed the dialogue for WILPF in the Americas. Instead of fostering US-dominance, Brainerd's approach was one of respect and encouragement of internationalist goals. She did not try to hide the fact that her previous employment at the Pan-American Union might cause raised-eyebrows and questions of imperialist motives, but addressed the issue and reassured the women in other WILPF branches of her sincerity. Her efforts in Mexico for the most part did not succeed, as though there was initial progress by the mid-1930s it was clear that for Mexican women the fight for political rights was not the same as the internationalist's goals. Internationalists had moved to a position of supporting equal personhood and Mexican women wanted recognition of their rights as women. Brainerd had somewhat better success in Central America, when in 1947 she served on the organizing committee of the WILPF's call for the Primer Congreso Interamericano de Mujeres held in Guatemala City, Guatemala. The conference topics included pacifist goals, as well as feminist issues in an internationalist focus. At the close of the conference, she was acknowledged as one of the highest ranking women of the conference. After the conference, Brainerd, Carmen Sánchez de Bustamante Calvo de Lozada, and Annalee Stewart worked to try to organize a follow-up conference, but reported scant progress and the need to reorganize, as well as the closure of organization of the Guatemalan sponsors of the event.

In 1954, Brainerd became the Honorary Vice President of the U.S. Section of WILPF. She was decorated by Venezuela, receiving the Medal of Public Instruction and by Ecuador, which honored her with the Order of Merit.

== Death and legacy ==
Brainerd died on 16 February 1969 in Freeport, Illinois. Several scholarships bearing her name were created to promote Latin American studies. The Jane Addams Peace Association of New York, also created a scholarship bearing her name.

== See also ==
- List of peace activists
