= John Dewhurst =

John Dewhurst may refer to

- Sir Christopher John Dewhurst (1920–2006), English gynecologist
- Jack Dewhurst (1876–1924), English footballer with Blackburn Rovers and Bury
