= Primer Congreso Interamericano de Mujeres =

The Primer Congreso Interamericano de Mujeres (First Inter-American Congress of Women) was a feminist meeting held from 21 to 27 August 1947 in Guatemala City, Guatemala. It was called together by the Women's International League for Peace and Freedom (WILPF) and hosted by the Unión Democrática de Mujeres of Guatemala. This organization had been formed by Angelina Acuña de Castañeda, Berta Corleto, Elisa Hall de Asturias, Gloria Menéndez Mina de Padilla, Rosa de Mora, Irene de Peyré, and Graciela Quan immediately following the Guatemalan 1944 coup d'état to push for recognition of women's civil rights.

There were representatives from countries throughout the Americas who accepted the invitation to attend the Conference, but the delegates were not country representatives. Instead, the women represented women's clubs throughout the region. The women participating were from: Argentina, Bolivia, Brazil, Canada, Chile, Colombia, Costa Rica, Cuba, El Salvador, Ecuador, Guatemala, Haiti, Honduras, Mexico, Nicaragua, Panama, Puerto Rico, United States, Uruguay and Venezuela. The women were not politically radical but believed in peace, political equality, and security of human welfare. The first press release issued spoke against the Rio Pact, which was simultaneously being discussed at a conference in Rio de Janeiro and urged arming the nation states of the Western Hemisphere and consolidating their agreement for reciprocal assistance. The women insisted on their right to speak on international issues and urged peace in the region.

== Program ==
The meeting was presided over by the Panamanian delegate, Gumercinda Páez with the Guatemalan First Lady, Elisa Martínez de Arévalo, as honorary president. Heloise Brainerd acted as General Secretary. Funding for the event came mainly from North American sources including the National Council of Negro Women, the National Federation of Business and Professional Women's Clubs, the Pan-American League of Miami, the People’s Mandate Committee, the US WILPF section and Zonta International.

The program centered on six themes discussed in committees, covering such topics as nuclear arms and nuclear power; pro-democracy movement; interrelations of the Americas; immigration, refugees and war victims; and civil and political rights. Clearly, they were not just interested in traditional women's issues and the list of delegates shows that many of the women were drawn from a wide swath of society, yet atypical of most women in their societies. They were educated, professionals (though some were blue-collar and others white-collar workers), who were active outside the home and involved in international politics.

=== Nuclear arms ===
The committee to discuss nuclear power was led by Professor María Rivera Urquieta of Chile. They discussed many aspects of the threat of nuclear weaponry and urged as one of their 8 recommendations that all steps be taken ensure that nuclear weapons were not used again, including destroying all existing weapons and the manufacturing plants that produced them. In addition, they recommended a broad education program so that all members of society, including children and the elderly understood both the benefits and dangers of nuclear power. Finally, they urged that the United Nations appoint pacifist women to posts to help regulate and monitor all aspects of the atomic industry including financing, production and raw materials, in an effort to prevent any further atomic war.

=== Conceptualizing democracy ===
The second committee led by Ecuadorian Nela Martínez discussed how the concept of democracy had to be expanded to include more than just a political sphere. They recommended that democracy must include raising the standard of living of all people to respect economic, political and cultural parity; that it include the right of self-determination for women and indigenous people; and that discrimination exercised against individuals or groups of people on the basis of "race, religion, ideology, sex or national origin" be discouraged. The also strongly urged that in all cases, military authority must be subordinate to civil authority and that any plan to arm the Americas should be immediately dropped and peaceful cooperation should become the goal.

=== Human rights ===
Ana Rosa Tornero of Bolivia headed the third committee which focused on human rights including economic security, education, health care and freedom of expression. They discussed many aspects of what respecting human rights entails, including the right of all humans for the having sufficient access to education, food, health, and sanitary housing. They recommended that governments promote access to free public education including bilingual studies to reach the largest possible number of people and special education classes for those with different physical or mental needs. They suggested that government adopt policies against smoking and alcohol to protect the health of citizens, provide sexual hygiene education to adolescents and adopt policies for the rehabilitation of prostitutes. They urged that working women's rights to be promoted be secured and that social security programs be inclusive for all members of society. They backed children's rights, suggested daycare centers be provided for day laborer's children, and that juvenile justice systems should be established, which protected children whether legitimate or illegitimate, whether the parents were married or unmarried. They suggested that single women's rights should be protected and justice systems be revised to better implement fairness and equity. Finally, they recognized that freedom of conscience and freedom of worship and expression should be protected and never used as a means to impose political or economic ideology.

=== Inter-American policy issues ===
Guatemalan Maria del Carmen Vargas and Salvadoran Matilde Elena López led the committee to discuss Inter-American policy issues. The women were well aware of the simultaneous session going on in Rio de Janeiro, working toward expanding arms and reciprocal assistance, which was seen as at odds with their pacifist goals. The women stressed support for the goals of the Atlantic Charter and the Act of Chapultepec, which promoted peace and support for all nations in the region. They urged disarmament, recognizing that increasing armament was not only a means for increasing security, but also had the potential to be turned against the people. They urged policies that did not increase the industrialized nations at the expense of those with less industrialization and stressed that more developed countries should help raise standards of living for everyone. The committee spoke against the Taft Hartley Act which violated worker’s rights, expansionist policies of the US, and non-democratic regimes, which threatened the rights of citizens. They stipulated that passports and currencies throughout the Americas be standardized to allow for free trade and free movement of citizens. Overall they endorsed support for the United Nations and its goals of pacifism and international cooperation, rather than exploitation.

=== Immigration and displaced persons ===
The fifth committee looked at European immigration, refugees and victims of war, but was expanded at the urging on Honduran Paca Navas de Miralda to include political prisoners and political exiles in Latin America. The committee was headed by Mexican Judith Horcasitas de Forgrave and the women resolved that immigrants must be free to choose the country they are most suited for and that the United Nations should facilitate expansion of immigration quotas in all countries to resettle displaced persons. They heard from Palestinian representative Rose Gutman, who stressed the need for resolution of "the Palestine question" and development of a home for stateless Jews. Lastly, they urged immediate emergency relief be developed by women's groups and the United Nations for the relief of children and the malnutrition caused by the ravages of war.

=== Civil and political rights ===
The sixth committee tended to evaluate issues which had more often been construed as feminist issues—women's civil and political rights and access to posts of responsibility. It was chaired by Amalia González Caballero de Castillo Ledón of Mexico. Though many issues were discussed, among the most important were recognition of the equality of men's and women's civil and political rights, implementation of civil marriage and divorce throughout the Americas, unrestricted access to finances within the marriage, the elimination of exemption from prosecution for uxoricide in cases of adultery, freedom of choice for spouses to determine their nationality, uniform policies of obligation for parental support of children, abolition of the death penalty, and encouragement of women's organizations and strengthening the access women have to posts of responsibility.

== Resolutions ==
The resolutions phase was presided over by Lucila Rubio de Laverde of Colombia. At the conclusion, six cables were sent. To George Marshall, US secretary of state and Raoul Fernández, president of the Rio Conference the cable denounced armament and urged that the funds proposed for weapons be redirected toward developing programs for industry, agriculture and heath programs for citizens. Another cable urged breaking with dictators and denounced Franco. Three cables went to individuals as homage for their like-mindedness: to Eleanor Roosevelt, for championing peace and international cooperation; to Paulina Luisi for her fight for women’s rights; and to Henry Wallace for his efforts toward Latin America in defense of peace.

The women resolved to encourage world peace and strengthening democracy in the Americas. They determined to form a federation consisting of a Secretariat of three members elected by the Congress, a committee composed of three secretariat members and six members appointed by the congress representing the various regions. The appointees to the committee were Beatrice Brigden representing Canada and the US; Judith Horcasitas de Forgrave representing Central America and Mexico; Gumercinda Páez representing the Antilles and Panama; Lucila Rubio de Laverde representing Colombia, Ecuador, Peru, and Venezuela; María Mercedes Rivera Urquieta representing Bolivia, Chile, and Paraguay; and María Teresa Ferrari de Gaudino representing Argentina, Brazil and Uruguay.

The secretariat was charged with coordination of the work to secure publication. The executive committee was charged with implementing adoption of resolutions and compliance with the resolutions, as well as preparing and obtaining ratification of governing documents for the Federation.

There is no evidence that the federation was ever launched, but the resolutions they proposed were adopted virtually verbatim by the Organization of American States Comision Inter-Americano de Mujeres (CIM) held in Caracas in 1949.

== Attendees ==
- Argentina: María Teresa Ferrari de Gaudino for the Federación Argentina de Mujeres Universitarias
- Bolivia: Carmen Sánchez de Bustamante Calvo de Lozada (12 Welwyn Road, Great Neck, New York, and box 51 of La Paz, Bolivia) (mother of future Bolivian president Gonzalo Sánchez de Lozada) and Ana Rosa Tornero
- Brazil: the delegate represented the Sociedad Cívica Femenina de Santos, Brasil
- Canada: Beatrice Brigden, of the Local Council of Women (1175 Dominion St., Winnipeg, Manitoba); Mildred Fahrni, of the Women's International League (4536 - 8th. Ave W., Vancouver, BC); and Helen R. Dlury of the National Council of Women and Canadian Clubs (309 Daly Ave. Ottawa)
- Chile: María Rivera Urquieta, representing the Asociaciones Cristianas Femeninas, Círculo Pro Paz y de Cooperación Americana, Consejo Nacional de Mujeres and Federación Chilena Femenina (casilla 1214, Valparaíso)
- Colombia: Soledad Peña, of the Unión Femenina de Colombia and Lucila Rubio de Laverde, of the Alianza Femenina Colombiana (calle 10 #19-64, Bogotá)
- Costa Rica: Odilia Castro Hidalgo and Corina Rodríguez López
- Cuba: Malin ? for La Cruz Blanca de la Paz
- El Salvador: María Cruz Palma, of the Liga Femenina Salvadoreña (18 AN # 62, San Salvador); Rosa Amelia Guzmán, of the Liga Femenina Salvadoreña and for the Asociación de Costureras (housed in the Librería Patria of San Salvador); and Matilde Elena López.
- Ecuador: Ligia Guerrero Vallejo for the Damas Protectoras del Obrero (calle Santa María 362, Quito) and Nela Martínez Espinoza
- Guatemala: María del Carmen Vargas; Marín d'Echevers; Hortencia Hernández Rojas (2a. Av. S. # 24); María Luisa Laínez; Gloria Menéndez Mina; Victoria Moraga Martines, for the congress' hosts Unión Democrática de Mujeres (Callejón Delfino No. 11 B), and Magdalena Spínola.
- Haiti: Alice Garoute, for the Ligue Féminine d'Action Sociale (43 Rue Christophe, Port-au-Prince)
- Honduras: Argentina Díaz Lozano; Lucila Gamero de Medina, for the Comités Pro Paz y Libertad de San Pedro Sula y Tegucigalpa; Helena Leiva de Holst for the Honduran exiles in Guatemala and Paca Navas de Miralda.
- Mexico: Amalia González Caballero de Castillo Ledón for the Inter-American Commission of Women; Judith Horcasitas de Forgrave of the Servicio Civil de Mujeres Mexicanas (Mississippi #117-11, México, DF); Professor Emilia Loyola representing all of the teachers of Mexico City (Medellín 355, Dpto.3); Elena Sánchez Valenzuela, for the Mexican Teachers, National Film Archive and Secretary of Educación (Coahuila 106 - apto 9); and Rosa Torre González, of the Liga Internacional and People's Mandate (Querétaro 102, letra E, México, DF)[
- Nicaragua: Alicia Fornos Ramos, for the Mesa Redonda and Liga de Mujeres (3a. calle SE 4a. y 5a. Ave. Managua DN) and Olga Núñez Abaunza de Saballo (a lawyer from Nicaragua) for the Inter-American Commission of Women
- Panama: Gumercinda Páez (calle Victoriano Lorenzo No.21, apartado 1627)
- Puerto Rico: the delegate represented the Asociación Puertorriquena de Esposas de Masones
- United States: Laura Albrecht; Adelaide Baker; Aida Donnelli; Marjorie S. Elliott of the Zonta International (Canadian Embassy, Santiago, Chile); Maria E. Gardiner; Dorothy A. Hickie (34 Isabella St., Boston 16, Mass.); Lyu Smith de Mandaley (5406 Connecticut Ave, NW Washington, DC); Lucille Mercer of Delta Kappa Gamma (32 Gabley E. Rd., Berea, Ohio); Elsie L. Picon, the International Women's League for Peace and Freedom (2281 Grand Boulevard, Detroit 8 Michigan); Grace K. Sabor, for WILPF and Pan American Women's Club of Minneapolis, Minnesota (4950 Harriet Ave., Minneapolis, Minn); Annalee Stewart, President of the American branch of the Women's International League for Peace and Freedom (1734 F St NW, Washington 6, DC); Frances Benedict Stewart, delegate of the International Women's League for Peace and Freedom and World Federation (1645 Kimble St., Utica - 3 NY); Mary Tailisoff of the Pan American Women's Association (39 Ocean Ave. Brookly, NY); Carolyn B. Threlkeld, the Women's International League for Peace and Freedom (170 Tamalpais Road, 8 Berkeley, California), Sue Bailey Thurman, the National Council of Negro Women (2660 California Street, San Francisco); and Mary Magdalene Wilkin (4 River Road, Youngstown, NY).
- Uruguay: Eloísa García Etchegoyhen, of the Alianza Uruguaya de Mujeres (Santa Lucía 4638, Montevideo)
- Venezuela: Enriqueta de Landaeta and Isabel Sánchez de Urdaneta (Venezuela’s woman consul to New York) for the Inter-American Commission of Women
- Palestine: Rose Gutman of the Women International League for Peace and Freedom (60 West 11 Street, Tel Aviv, Palestine)
