= Eloísa García Etchegoyhen =

Uruguayan educator and disability rights activist (1921-1996)

- Born: María Eloísa García Etchegoyhen; 8 July 1921; Montevideo, Uruguay
- Died: 29 January 1996 (aged 74); Montevideo, Uruguay
- Other name: María Eloísa García Etchegoyhen de Lorenzo
- Education: University of Michigan
- Occupations: Disability rights activist, educator, feminist
- Years active: 1941–1996

Eloísa García Etchegoyhen (1921-1996) was a pioneering Uruguayan educator and disability rights activist. She not only created the first educational facilities in Uruguay to teach those with disabilities, but she developed job placement programs and parent support groups to help children integrate into the larger society. She spearheaded training for teachers and psychologists leading to the creation of research programs into the cause of intellectual disability and led a public awareness campaign to encourage acceptance of disabled people by their families and communities. She began the first school for students with multiple disabilities and began the first pre-school for early assessment and intervention for disabled children in Uruguay. She brought the Special Olympics to Uruguay and worked throughout Latin America and the Caribbean for inclusive policies for disabled citizens.

== Biography ==
María Eloísa García Etchegoyhen was born 8 July 1921 in Montevideo, Uruguay to Marcos García and María Etchegoyhen. Her mother died when García was very young and she was raised by her old sister, Manacha. She attended primary school at "the Prada" and completed her secondary education at Instituto La Femenina. She studied to be a teacher, graduating in 1941 from the Instituto Normal María Stagnero de Munar, Her first job was in Isla Patrulla and after a few months there she transferred to Santa Clara, where she first encountered developmentally delayed students. She contacted her superiors and was given permission to study special education and returned to Montevideo.

Between 1943 and 1944, she studied "mental retardation" and earned a specialists certificate in 1944. She began working with Dr. Emilio Mira y Lopez in 1945 at the Laboratory of Psychology researching "marginal cases" and was awarded an authorization to perform professional guidance counseling for schoolchildren. Dr. Mira also helped her apply for a scholarship to go to school in the US, which she won from the Institute of International Education. From 1945 to 1946, she worked in the Marlboro Psychiatric Hospital in New Jersey and simultaneously at the International Institute of Education (1945-1947), receiving a certificate of mastery of Mental Hygiene and Abnormal Children's Organizational Services. García then participated in three work-study programs between 1946 and 1947 at the University of Michigan, at Cove School and the Institute of General Semantics. During her time in school, in 1947, she participated in the feminist Primer Congreso Interamericano de Mujeres, as a representative for Alianza Uruguaya de Mujeres held in Guatemala City, Guatemala. She attended the conference which explored not only women's issues, but also looked at world affairs, such as nuclear capacity, disarmament, peace, exiles, and many other issues of the post-war era. In 1948, she graduated with a master's degree in Clinical Psychology with a specialization in special education and preschool early intervention and stimulation from the University of Michigan.

García joined the internship program of the United Nations in 1948 and returned home to Uruguay, reorganizing the Escuela Auxiliar to Escuela de Recuperación Psíquica Número 1. She directed the organization for the next eighteen years. When García took over the facility, it was a depository for children with disabilities and no attempts were made to educate them. One of her first objectives was to reorganize the school to help each student develop skills, learn knowledge and develop an attitude that personal empowerment could be achieved. She had to train professionals as well, teaching courses in psychology at the University of the Republic School of Nursing, Social Services Department, the Psychology and Human Relations Department and organizing courses and seminars focused on the treatment of children with intellectual disabilities for teachers at the Normal Institute of Montevideo.

One of the first things she did was establish a Club for Parents, whose purpose was to provide a support network for families. They published a newsletter and held support groups twice daily. Once during the day and another at night so that regardless of work schedules, parents could participate. The focus was on information, and sharing of experiences, because even the medical community did not know what caused a lot of the developmental delays or what the learning capacity of the children was. She also established guidelines to allow Down syndrome students to participate in schooling. Until García's proposal to the Education Council, Downs students and those with IQs under 50, were not allowed to participate in school in Uruguay.

García insisted that all of her staff be properly trained. In 1954 she took a scholarship from the Institute of Inter-American Affairs and studied rehabilitation programs for disabled patients, receiving a certificate of Vocational Rehabilitation Specialist from the US State Department in Washington, DC. She sent staff to Argentina study motor skills disorders and rehabilitation later sending students to study in the US and Puerto Rico on neuromuscular control. In 1956, the school accepted its first students with multiple disabilities and in 1957 they undertook a study on occupational rehabilitation and preparedness of their students. What they determined was that most of the students were unprepared for employment. To address the shortfall, in 1958 García implemented an occupational rehabilitation program which aimed to give students vocational training simultaneously with academic training, had staff complete individual assessments of students' skills and employer needs, and through a "protected workshop" environment to continue monitoring trainees after placement.

By the 1960s, García was ready to tackle early childhood development, as new scientific research was showing the positive impact of early education. She submitted a proposal for a pre-school to be developed using the expertise of a visiting Fulbright Scholar, Dr. Howard Norris. In 1962 the program was approved and Norris began work with pediatrician, a psychologist, a visiting teacher and a nurse. They began with a diagnosis of the nature of the disability, counseling with parents as to what outcomes were likely and then created a plan of action to further the education of the child. That same year she launched a public awareness campaign hoping to build an infrastructure of care, integration, protection and support for people with disabilities. She founded the Asociación Nacional pro NiñoRetardado Mental (ANR) to promote the general welfare and development of programs and research to benefit developmentally disabled people. By 1966, García expanded the program further, to include a research program working with expectant mothers. In that same year, she won the 1966 Joseph P. Kennedy Jr. Foundation Award for her contributions to mental health.

García began working with the Organization of American States Inter-American Children's Institute (IIN) in 1966, as the head of the Special Education and Early Childhood Division. She served for the next twenty years trying to develop and improve special education programs throughout Latin America and the Caribbean and foster collaboration between European and US academic and medical centers with their counterparts in Latin American and the Caribbean. In 1967, García was named to the Consejo Nacional de Enseñanza Primaria y Normal and became responsible for overseeing all primary education, special education and teacher training in Uruguay. In 1983, she brought the Special Olympics to Uruguay and facilitated the country joining the international organization.

García received many awards over her long career including a Kennedy Foundation Honor in 1966; the Award for Leadership in Mental Deficiency from the American Association on Mental Deficiency (Chicago, USA, 1976); Award of Merit from the Panamanian President's Committee on Mental Retardation (1975); Order of the Corbata Class A, Andrés Bello from the Government of Venezuela (Caracas, Venezuela, 1976); and an appointment by the Secretary General of the UN to participate in the "World Symposium of Experts on International Cooperation Programs for Disabled", awarded by the International Association for the Scientific Study of Mental Deficiency (India, 1985). In 1988 she was honored by the OAS with the Andrés Bello Award for her regional contributions to the education of disabled people; that same year she was awarded a medal from the Government of Ecuador for her efforts in special education; and the following year the University of Kansas created a scholarship through the Bureau of Child Research in her name, which is granted to professionals wishing to study early intervention and stimulation.

She was President of the International League of Associations for Persons with Mental Handicap from 1986 to 1990. In that office oversaw the communications and international exchange between institutions of five continents was publicly recognized by President François Mitterrand, when she retired. The Uruguayan government renamed the Educational complex of Special Schools Nº203 and 280 in Montevideo after her in 1994 and in 1995, she received the Royal Association for Prevention and Care of Persons with Disabilities Reina Sofia Award for Rehabilitation and Integration in Madrid in 1995.

== Selected works ==
- "La importancia del diagnóstico educacional" (1949)
- "La deficiencia mental y el problema que plantea a nuestra enseñanza primaria" (1949)
- "La ciencia al servicio de la educación: El lápiz que habla" (1949)
- "Valor de la clase pre-primaria en la Enseñanza Especial" (1950)
- "Algunas sugerencias que pueden favorecer el mecanismo de la lectura en niños de aprendizaje lento" (1951)
- "La Enseñanza Especial La Escuela Auxiliar" (1954)
- "Fines y School Organization psychological recovery No. 1" (1955)
- "Madres que esperan familia" (1956?)
- "Clínica preescolar" (1956?)
- "Campamento para niños retardados mentales" (1956?)
- "Diez lecciones que los niños deben aprender antes de entrar a la Escuela" (1957)
- "Sugerencias para enfocar la educación de los niños" (1958)
- "Por qué trabajamos con padres (1958)
- "Ustedes no están solos. En colaboración con la señora Nelly Mangini de Lermitte" (1958)
- "Psicoterapia con los Retardados Mentales" (1958)
- "Orientaciones a las Auxiliares Vigilantes" (1964)
- "Una tipología de los objetivos del programa para alumnos retardados mentales" (1964)
- Dos ensayos: El desafio de la época actual a la organización educativa. Enfoque multidisciplinario en el entrenamiento del equipo interdisciplinario Montevideo: Consejo Nacional de Enseñanza, (1968)
- La epilepsia, inteligencia, y aprendizaje Montevideo: O.E.A., Instituto Interamericano del Niño (1970)
- Enseñanza especial y entrenamiento vocacional Montevideo: O.E.A., Instituto Interamericano del Niño (1970)
- La educación de los padres del niño retardado Montevideo: O.E.A., Instituto Interamericano del Niño (1970)
- Administracíon de servicios en enseñanza especial Montevideo: Instituto Interamericano del Niño (1973)
- Factor socio-económico que afecta el proceso de aprendizaje Montevideo: Instituto Interamericano del Niño (1973)
- Estimulación precoz, acción preventiva y remedial Montevideo: O.E.A., Instituto Interamericano del Niño (1974)
- Early intervention with the multihandicapped child Montevideo: Instituto Interamericano del Niño (1975)
- Mental retardation: an international view Racine, Wisconsin: Johnson Foundation, (1976)
- Planning the Future of Special Education: Our Duty, Our Responsibility, and Our Privilege U.S. Department of Education (1978)
