= Ramón Carrillo =

1st Argentine Minister of Health

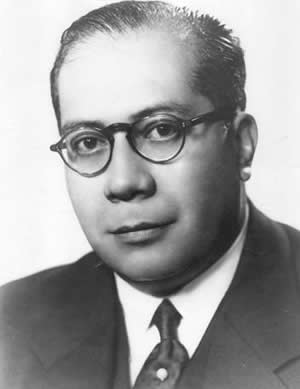

Minister of Public Health
- In office 11 March 1949 – 23 July 1954
- President: Juan Perón
- Preceded by: post created
- Succeeded by: Raúl Bevecqua

Personal details
- Born: 7 March 1906 Santiago del Estero, Argentina
- Died: 20 December 1956 (aged 50) Belém, Brazil
- Party: Peronist Party
- Education: University of Buenos Aires
- Profession: Neurosurgeon, physician, and academic

Ramón Carrillo (7 March 1906 – 20 December 1956) was an Argentine neurosurgeon, neurobiologist, physician, academic, public health advocate, and from 1949 to 1954 the nation's first Minister of Public Health.

== Early life and education ==
Carrillo was born in Santiago del Estero on 7 March 1906 into an Afro-Argentine family. He attended the University of Buenos Aires' Faculty of Medicine and obtained a degree in 1929 with a Gold Medal as best student in his class.

He showed a preference for neurology and neurosurgery, collaborating with eminent neurosurgeon Manuel Balado, a Mayo Clinic alumnus and like Carrillo a student of Christfried Jakob at the University of Buenos Aires. Under Balado, Carrillo published his initial scientífic articles. After graduation he obtained a travel grant in order to further his studies in Europe, where he worked in the best neuroscience laboratories, Cornelius Ariëns Kappers's and Carl Vogt's among them.

== Career in social medicine ==
He returned to Buenos Aires in the mid 1930s. Known in Argentina as the "Infamous Decade," Carrillo described this period in Argentine history as the "systematic sacking and destruction of his fatherland, a period characterized by the leaders' deep moral decadence, in which self-imposed corruption, economic felonies, the selling out of the national patrimony, and the impoverishment of the population's majority prevail" (Ordóñez).

Disillusioned with liberal democracy, Carrillo adhered to the locally rising nacionalista thought and complemented his scientific research with evolving political ideas and cultural education. He enjoyed friendships with numerous leading names in Argentine tango culture and the new nationalist ideas, including poet and songwriter Homero Manzi (an erstwhile elementary school friend), as well as nationalist activists Arturo Jauretche and Raúl Scalabrini Ortiz, and tango and theater composers Armando Discépolo y Enrique Santos Discépolo. He also maintained close academic links with prominent German Argentine neurobiologists such as his former professor Christfried Jakob and two leading figures in Argentine neuropsychiatric science, Drs. José Borda and Braulio Moyano.

=== Research ===
Between 1930 and 1945 Carrillo contributed valuable original research on glial cells and the method for staining and observing them under the microscope, as well as on their evolutionary origin (phylogeny), and the comparative anatomy of the brain across the several classes of vertebrates. He also contributed novel techniques for neurological diagnosis: he refined iodine-contrasted ventriculography, called iodoventriculography, and discovered signs in it for several diseases; developed tomography, which by lack of electronic means at the time was prevented from integrating computation yet was a precursor of what is today known as computerized tomography; and achieved its combination with electroencephalogram, termed tomoencephalography.

Carrillo also produced a body of research into brain herniations protruding into blood cisterns (cisternal herniations) and the syndromes occurring after a brain contusion; he discovered acute papillitis; described in detail the cerebral scleroses, during whose research he performed many cerebral transplants (brain grafts) between living rabbits; and histologically reclassified the cerebral tumors and the inflammations of the innermost brain envelope (arachnoid mater) known as arachnoiditis. He also proposed a widely used, pre-DSM classification of mental illnesses. Against considerable opposition from conservative colleagues, in 1942 and at the age of 36 Carrillo became the Chair of Neurosurgery at the University of Buenos Aires School of Medicine. Among the influential Argentine physicians he trained were Germán Dickmann, Raúl Matera, D. E. Nijensohn, Raúl Carrea, Fernando Knesevich, Lorenzo Amezúa, Jorge Cohen, Jacobo and Leon Zimman, Rogelio Driollet Laspiur, Juan C. Christensen, and Alberto D. Kaplan.

=== Later career ===
During those years Carrillo exclusively dedicated himself to research and teaching, until becoming Head (1939) of the Neurology and Neurosurgery Service in the Central Military Hospital. This post afforded him a deep acquaintance with the real situation of public health in Argentina, which like his own province reflected a state of neglect in much of the countryside. He became well informed on the clinical files of all young men examined for enrollment into military service, and became aware of the high prevalence of poverty-linked diseases (especially in recruits from the poorest provinces). He carried out statistical studies showing that the country only had 45% of the required hospital beds, and that these were moreover unevenly distributed.

Carrillo was at the height of his medical career when he became acquainted with the Colonel Juan Domingo Perón, a patient at the Central Military Hospital with whom Carrillo shared long talks. Colonel Perón was the increasingly influential Labor Minister in the nationalist military regime that took power after the 1943 Argentine coup d'état, and during these talks persuaded Carrillo to help plan national health policies. Carrillo, at age 39, briefly served as Dean of the School of Medicine, acting as a go-between in a fierce, highly politized, Left-Right university conflict, which ultimately forced him to quit his faculty post.

== Argentina's first health minister ==
Juan Perón was elected to the nation's presidency in February 1946, appointing Carrillo as head of the State Secretary of Public Health; when President Perón promoted this latter office to a cabinet-level ministry, Carrillo was sworn in as the nation's first Minister of Public Health on 11 March 1949.

Carrillo appointed leading figures in Argentine medicine such as Salomón Chichilnisky, the neuroscientist Braulio Moyano, and his own brother, Santiago Carrillo (who had worked extensively with Moyano at Borda Hospital), to administrative posts in the new Health Ministry. Longtime colleagues at the University of Buenos Aires, Chichilnisky and the new Health Minister had become close friends during the latter's illness in 1937, and as Secretary of Health in the early 1950s he helped Health Minister Carrillo commission hundreds of public hospitals in Argentina. Perón's wife, Evita, also contributed to his tenure by coordinating public health policy at the well-funded Eva Perón Foundation with Carrillo, helping advance and fund many of his works and initiatives.

His tenure would be marked by prolific, hitherto unsurpassed advances in Argentine public health. He increased the number of hospital beds in the country, from 66,300 in 1946 to 132,000 in 1954. He eradicated, in only two years, endemic diseases such as malaria, by means of highly aggressive campaigns against the vector. Syphilis and venereal diseases practically vanished. He built 234 free, public hospitals or policlinics, lowered the tuberculosis mortality rate from 130 per 100,000 to 36 per 100,000, ended epidemics such as typhus and brucellosis, and decreased drastically the nation's infant mortality rate from 90 to 56 per thousand live births.

As Health Minister Carrillo prioritized the development of preventive medicine, the hospitals' running organization, and concepts such as regulative centralization and executive decentralization (centralización normativa y descentralización ejecutiva). He did so without mandating decentralization with merely economic goals imposed by the markets. Corresponding by letter with Norbert Wiener, the creator of cybernetics, Carrillo applied it to the art of government with what he referred to as "cybernology" (cibernología), creating an Instituto de Cibernología (in effect, strategic planning) in 1951. He also partnered with Argentine Railways to establish a "Health Train" service equipped with mobile clinics to reach some of the most remote and impoverished regions in the country. The service was discontinued after his resignation.

Carrillo resigned on 16 June 1954, having lost support from the government in the aftermath of Eva Perón's death. He was succeeded by Raúl Bevacqua.

== Personal life ==
Carrillo remained single, and supported his mother and ten younger brother and sisters. He suffered an acute illness in 1937 which left him with chronic hypertension and progressively severe headaches. He was saved by Salomón Chichilnisky, who in his youth worked as stevedore in the Port of Buenos Aires to support his parents, and despite these difficulties became a Chaired Professor of Neurology. They became close friends and colleagues afterward.

Following the 1955 coup d'état against Perón and the subsequent persecution of peronists by the military regime, Carrillo was forced into exile. He died on 20 December 1956 in Belém do Pará, Brazil, aged 50.

== Legacy ==
Carrillo was ultimately recognized as the architect of Argentina's modern national health system. His name was then imparted to numerous Argentine hospitals and institutions related to public health. It is frequently ascribed to the embarrassment Carrillo's model produced in less competent politicians the fact that, afterwards, his biography, ideas, and contributions to science remained generally unknown, except for outlines in neurobiology in which Carrillo took part. He likewise left numerous large but incomplete skeletons for several hospitals that were discarded after his resignation, and even as late as 2004.

His brother Arturo Carrillo, still in hardship and without any official funding, published a biography detailing the magnitude of his achievements and sacrifices, Ramón Carrillo, el hombre, el médico y el sanitarista. Professor Daniel Chiarenza also published a biography of Carrillo, El Olvidado de Belém, in 2005. By Executive Order 1558 dated 9 December 2005, the Argentine Government decreed the full year 2006 as "Year of Honor to Ramón Carrillo."

Numerous authors agree that the most important heritage bestowed by Ramón Carrillo were the ideas, principles, and grounding motives which accompanied his deeds. "The problems of Medicine as a branch of the State cannot be resolved while health policy is not backed by social policy. Similarly, there cannot be an effective social policy without an economy organized to benefit the greater part of the population. In the field of health, scientific achievements are only useful when they reach the whole population."

A new 2,000 peso banknote, due to Argentina's high inflation, has been designed with Carrillo and Cecilia Grierson on the front.
