= Elena Sánchez Valenzuela =

Mexican silent film actress, journalist, feminist and suffragette

- Elena Sánchez Valenzuela, before 1920
- Born: 2 March 1900; Mexico City, Mexico
- Died: 30 September 1950 (aged 50); Mexico City, Mexico
- Occupations: actress, journalist, film archivist
- Years active: 1918–1950

Elena Sánchez Valenzuela (2 March 1900 – 30 September 1950) was a Mexican actress, journalist and creator of the Mexican film archive. One of her country’s first silent film stars, she was also a feminist and suffragette.

== Biography ==
Valenzuela was born on 2 March 1900 in Mexico City, Mexico to journalist Abraham Sánchez Arce and Juana Valenzuela. She was still a student at the National Conservatory of Music when she made her film debut in Barranca trágica (1917). The following year, she was chosen to star in the first film adaptation of Federico Gamboa's 1902 novel, Santa (1918). The silent film was produced by Germán Camus, directed by Luis G. Peredo It would establish a formula that prevailed in Mexico until the 1940s, the theme of the "noble prostitute", a girl typically living in urban slums, caught in the trap of the onset of modernity and industrialization. In Santa, after a young peasant girl named Santa is seduced and abandoned by a soldier, the affair is discovered by her family and she is banished. She relocates to Mexico City and turns to prostitution to support herself. The film premiered on 13 July 1918 and was a sensational hit.

In 1919 she starred in another film directed by Peredo, La llaga and in 1920 made El escándalo under the direction of Alfredo B. Cuellar. At the same time she was making films, Sánchez was mirroring her father's career as a journalist and had become a correspondent for El Demócrata. In August 1920, she was sent to Los Angeles, California as a correspondent for El Demócrata. While she was in the US, Sánchez won a contest organized by a local newspaper to promote her acting career and meet Hollywood personalities at publicity events at places like as Grauman's Chinese Theatre. She was offered a role in Almas que sufren, but the film project was abandoned and Sánchez returned to Mexico.

1921 brought her most acclaimed role, in En la hacienda, which premiered at Chapultepec Castle for President Álvaro Obregón. It was screened in 20 theaters and was declared the year's best motion picture. Like "Santa" before it, the film fostered an iconic genre, the rural melodrama, which typically featured poor, indigenous rural suffering. It would be her last role, as her father ordered her to end her career, which she had undertaken without his authorization as a minor. In 1922, she began writing a column in El Universal Gráfico called “El cine y sus artistas" (Cinema and Its Artists) and in 1929, she moved to Paris as a news correspondent for the next four years, returning to Mexico in the 1930s to work at El Día.

In 1936 Sánchez began working on a project called "Brigadas Cinematográficas" requested by President Lázaro Cárdenas. The film which she photographed and directed was a sound documentary about the state of Michoacán and was praised for its artistic and historic worth, depicting rural life in the western state. The film was feature-length and its contract stated that it could not be shown commercially. Throughout the 1930s she visited the film library of the Cine Club in Mexico City and lobbied for the creation of a functional and archival Cinematography Department of the Ministry of Education. Finally in 1942, she was successful and the Filmoteca Nacional (Mexican National Film Library) became a reality, when President Manuel Ávila Camacho not only authorized its creation but gave her the responsibility for promotion of archival preservation.

Sánchez began traveling the country in 1944 in an attempt to collect films, as only a few governmental agencies had sent in films. She visited with public agencies as well as private individuals and companies trying to convince them to archive copies of their films for preservation. By 1947, the archive had been assigned to National Autonomous University of Mexico and Sánchez began traveling throughout Latin America to urge film preservation. On one trip, she represented the Film Archive at the Primer Congreso Interamericano de Mujeres held in Guatemala City, Guatemala where the women were discussing enfranchisement, employment protections, as well as world affairs. In 1948, she was traveling through Argentina and Uruguay giving lectures on the Mexican film industry and her preservation work at the National Film Archive.

She died on 30 September 1950 in Mexico City.

== Filmography ==
- Barranca trágica (1917)
- Santa (1918)
- La llaga (1919)
- El escándalo (1920)
- En la hacienda (1921)
