= Christopher John Dewhurst =

British gynecologist

Sir Christopher John Dewhurst M.B., F.R.C.S.(Ed), F.R.C.O.G.
- Born: 2 July 1920; Lancashire, England
- Died: 1 December 2006 (aged 86)
- Education: Manchester University
- Occupation: Gynecologist
- Years active: 1945?–1986
- Known for: Jack Dewhurst
- Spouse: Hazel Dewhurst (m. c. 1951)
- Medical career
- Profession: Professor, physician
- Institutions: Saint Mary's Hospital, Manchester, Royal Postgraduate Medical School, Royal College of Obstetricians and Gynaecologists
- Sub-specialties: Pediatric and adolescent gynecology, intersexuality
- Notable works: Practical, Paediatric and Adolescent Gynaecology; Integrated Obstetrics and Gynaecology for Postgraduates

Sir Christopher John "Jack" Dewhurst FRCS FRCOG (2 July 1920 – 1 December 2006) was a British gynecologist. He was Professor and Head of Obstetrics and Gynaecology at the Royal Postgraduate Medical School, London University, from 1967 to 1985. He served as president of the Royal College of Obstetricians and Gynaecologists from 1975 to 1978.

Sir Christopher Dewhurst was knighted in 1978 for his work in medicine. He is considered to be one of the founders of the medical specialty of pediatric and adolescent gynecology. Sir Dewhurst published 109 peer-reviewed publications and co-wrote 13 medical textbooks during his career.

Sir Dewhurst chaired the 1st International Symposium on Gender Identity in London, United Kingdom in 1969 and provided the opening remarks for the conference.

== Selected publications ==
=== Books ===
- Christopher John Dewhurst (1960). A Student's Guide to Obstetrics and Gynaecology. Baillière, Tindall & Cassell.
- Christopher John Dewhurst (1963). Gynaecological Disorders of Infants and Children. Cassell.
- Christopher John Dewhurst; Ronald Roger Gordon (1969). The Intersexual Disorders. Baillière, Tindall & Cassell. ISBN 9780702002809.
- Christopher John Dewhurst (1972). Integrated Obstetrics and Gynaecology for Postgraduates. Blackwell Scientific. ISBN 978-0-632-06660-5. "Original title was to be "Disorders of Reproduction and the Reproductive Organs" but changed prior to publication."
- Christopher John Dewhurst, ed. (1974). Paediatric and Adolescent Gynaecology. Clinics in Obstetrics and Gynaecology. Vol. 3pages=481–702. London/Philadelphia: W.B. Saunders. ISBN 9780598186546. OCLC 1858813.
- Geoffrey Chamberlain; Sir Christopher John Dewhurst; Mark McCarthy (1977). A Practice of Obstetrics and Gynaecology. Pitman Medical. ISBN 978-0-272-79388-6.
- Sir Christopher John Dewhurst; Geoffrey Chamberlain (1980). Practical Pediatric and Adolescent Gynecology (1 ed.). M. Dekker. ISBN 978-0-8247-6978-9.
- Sir John Dewhurst (1980). Royal Confinements: A Gynaecological History of Britain's Royal Family. St. Martin's Press. ISBN 978-0-312-69466-1.
- John William Huffman; Sir Christopher John Dewhurst; Vincent J. Capraro (1981). The Gynecology of Childhood and Adolescence. Saunders. ISBN 978-0-7216-4816-3.
- Sir Christopher John Dewhurst (1 September 1984), Female Puberty and its Abnormalities, Current Reviews in Obstetrics and Gynecology, vol. 9, Churchill Livingstone, ISBN 9780443030598, ISSN 0264-5610, LCCN 84003134, OCLC 828175741, OL 2841261M
- Sir Christopher John Dewhurst; Michael De Swiet; Geoffrey Chamberlain (1986). Basic Science in Obstetrics and Gynaecology: A Textbook for MRCOG. Churchill Livingstone. ISBN 978-0-443-02287-6.
- Geoffrey Chamberlain; Charlotte R. Gibbings; Sir Christopher John Dewhurst (1989). Illustrated Textbook of Obstetrics. Lippincott. ISBN 978-0-397-44580-6.

==== Latest editions ====
- D. Keith Edmonds (13 February 2012). Dewhurst's Textbook of Obstetrics and Gynaecology (8 ed.). John Wiley & Sons. ISBN 978-0-470-65457-6.
- D. Keith Edmonds (1989). Dewhurst's Practical Paediatric and Adolescent Gynaecology (2 ed.). Elsevier. ISBN 978-1-4831-6291-1.

=== Book chapters ===
- Huffman J, Dewhurst CJ, Capraro VJ (1981). "The breast and its disorders in childhood and adolescence". The Gynecology of Childhood and Adolescence (2 ed.). WB Saunders Co. pp. 542–559.

=== Journal articles ===
- Dewhurst CJ (June 1967). "The XY female". J Obstet Gynaecol Br Commonw. 74 (3): 353–66. doi:10.1111/j.1471-0528.1967.tb03959.x. PMID 6026613. S2CID 36189343.
- Dewhurst CJ (August 1970). "The XY female child". Arch. Dis. Child. 45 (242): 595–9. doi:10.1136/adc.45.242.595. PMC 1647631. PMID 5528744.
- Dewhurst CJ (March 1971). "The XY female". Am. J. Obstet. Gynecol. 109 (5): 675–88. doi:10.1016/0002-9378(71)90753-8. PMID 5101599.
- Dewhurst CJ (November 1975). "The aetiology and management of intersexuality". Clin. Endocrinol. (Oxf). 4 (6): 625–42. doi:10.1111/j.1365-2265.1975.tb01932.x. PMID 1104219. S2CID 34236804.
- Capraro VJ, Dewhurst CJ (June 1975). "Breast disorders in childhood and adolescence". Clin Obstet Gynecol. 18 (2): 25–50. doi:10.1097/00003081-197506000-00003. PMID 1170054. S2CID 26676081.
- Dewhurst J (May 1981). "Breast disorders in children and adolescents". Pediatr. Clin. North Am. 28 (2): 287–308. doi:10.1016/s0031-3955(16)33997-9. PMID 7195539.
