= Beatrice Brigden =

Canadian politician (1888–1977)

- Born: 30 January 1888; Hastings, Ontario, Canada
- Died: 22 February 1977 (aged 89); Winnipeg, Manitoba, Canada
- Occupations: Social activist; feminist; politician
- Years active: 1914-1977

Beatrice Alice Brigden (1888-1977) was Canadian social reformer, first-wave feminist, writer, and politician in the early 20th century. She advocated for birth control, gender equality, and economic security at a time when such views were considered radical.

Brigden was a founder of the People's Forum Speaker's Bureau, the Labor Women's Social and Economic Conference, and Indian-Métis Friendship Centres, organisations that have had lasting impacts on labor rights, women's rights, and Indigenous advocacy in Canada.

Brigden was also founding member of the Co-operative Commonwealth Federation (CCF), a precursor to Canada's New Democratic Party (NDP) and she was one of only a few women at the time to run for public office, having attempted several times to win seats in the Manitoba legislature and the Federal Parliament.

== Early life and education ==
Brigden was born 30 January 1888 in Hastings, Ontario, Canada, the second of five children of William Brigden, a farmer and a Methodist, and Sarah Jane Wood, a Quaker. Brigden attended Albert College in Belleville, Ontario, in 1908 studying arts and vocal expression. After one year, she transferred to Brandon College and, in 1910, she received a diploma in public speaking.

A year later, she began studying at the Royal Conservatory of Music in Toronto. Bridgen graduated with a degree in psychology and vocal expression from the Conservatory in 1912.

== Early social advocacy ==
As part of her training at the Royal Conservatory, Brigden visited local factories and hospitals to provide workers and patients with uplifting entertainment. The experience raised Brigden's awareness seeing first-hand the unsanitary conditions and poor working conditions of labourers.

=== Methodist social worker ===
In 1913, Brigden began negotiating with the Methodist Church to teach social purity. In 1914, Brigden and the church came to an agreement and Brigden began training in La Crosse, Wisconsin as a Methodist social service worker, bolstered by self-directed study on sexual behavior and the psychology of sex.

Brigden spent six years lecturing on sex education and social ills throughout Canada. Increasingly, Brigden found herself turning away from the church and more toward socialism. Her work and studies led her to the conclusion that it was necessary to address economic issues to bring about real change, foreshadowing a later move into politics. Brigden resigned as a Methodist social worker after six years and joined the Brandon Labor Church where she served from 1920 to 1928.

=== People's Forum Speaker's Bureau ===
In the early 1920s, Brigden organized the People's Forum Speaker's Bureau, which included speakers such as John Queen, Anna Louise Strong, Frank Underhill, J. S. Woodsworth and others.

=== Cooperative Commonwealth Federation ===
In 1922, Brigden established the Labor Women's Social and Economic Conference (LWSEC) annual study groups in 1922 in an attempt to address the imbalance in men's and women's political education and women's self-confidence. The organization spread throughout western Canada, having chapters in each major population center. By the middle of the 1930s, the group merged with the Cooperative Commonwealth Federation.

== Political career ==
=== 1921 elections ===
In 1921, Brigden was invited to run for office on the Dominion Labour Party ticket.However, at the time, Brigden was caring for her aging parents as well as teaching classes for developmentally-challenged children for the local school board and turned down the offer. However, she did agree to become a campaign worker for Robert Forke on the Progressive ticket, which he handily won.

=== 1930 elections ===
In 1930, Brigden ran as Brandon's first federal Labour Party candidate on a Farmer-Labour platform. but lost to Conservative candidate David Wilson Beaubier. Only nine other female candidates were in the running that year, none of whom were elected to a federal seat. After her loss in the 1930 election, she moved to Winnipeg and began submitting articles to the ILP Weekly News and the Manitoba Commonwealth.

=== Co-operative Commonwealth Federation ===
In 1933, she was one of only 21 women who attended the Cooperative Commonwealth Federation Conference in Regina, to formally establish the Cooperative Commonwealth Federation party (CCF) and launch its Regina Manifesto. In 1934, she was on the party's national council.

In 1936, Brigden ran as ILP-CCF Candidate in the Manitoba general election. She did not win a seat in the election but later ran in both federal and provincial elections. CCF became the New Democratic Party in 1961 and she remained active in the party until 1975.

In 1937, she was elected Secretary-Treasurer of the Manitoba branch of the party.

== Later life and advocacy ==
=== First Inter-American Congress of Women ===
In 1947, Brigden attended the Primer Congreso Interamericano de Mujeres held in Guatemala City, Guatemala as the delegate for the Winnipeg International League for Peace and Freedom, one of only 3 Canadian delegates. The conference was called by the Women's International League for Peace and Freedom to discuss women's issues, pacifism and promote inter-American policies for dealing with armament, human rights, economic security, and many other topics.

=== Indian-Métis Friendship Centres ===
Between 1954 and 1958, Brigden served on the Indian and Métis Committee. She was recognized as an advocate for women's rights and an ally and advocate for aboriginal people and pressed for the opening of the Indian-Métis Friendship Centres to address the needs of urban aboriginal people.

In 1958, after four years of planning, a resolution was passed to open a referral centre to help first nations persons relocating to urban areas access the social services available. The first center opened in 1959. She continued to be active on the Board and in attendance at Conferences for the Indian and Métis Committee until 1969.

=== Leadership in other women's organizations ===
Brigden served in multiple capacities for many different women's groups. In 1947, she was elected President of the Winnipeg Council of Women. She was an organizer of Provincial Council of Women, a member and delegate to international meetings for the University Women's Club, Chairman of the Arts and Letters Committee of the National Council of Women, a member of the Women's International League for Peace and Freedom, an organizer of the SHARE and Open-Door Club for Canadian Mental Health Association, founder of the Indian-Métis Friendship Centres, and an organizer of Women's Model Parliaments.

== Honours and awards ==
In 1970, Brigden was honored by the Manitoba Historical Society receiving a Centennial Medal. She also received the Manitoba Golden Boy Award in recognition of her civic efforts. Brandon University awarded her an honorary degree in 1973.

== Death and legacy ==
Brigden died on 22 February 1977 in Winnipeg, Manitoba and was buried in the Napinka Cemetery.

== Publications ==
Bridgen wrote an autobiography entitled One Woman's Campaign for Social Purity and Social Reform, which was reproduced in 2014 in Forestell and Moynagh's Documenting First Wave Feminisms. Volume II, Canada - National and Transnational Contexts.

== Sources of information ==
Joan Sangster, “The Making of a Socialist-Feminist: The Early Career of Beatrice Brigden,” Atlantis (Fall 1987): 13–28.
