= Isabel Sánchez de Urdaneta =

Isabel Sánchez de Urdaneta was a Venezuelan stateswoman and feminist in the mid-twentieth century. She was a teacher and founder of kindergartens in Venezuela before she and her husband moved to Washington, D.C., where he took up a diplomatic position. She served as a delegate to the San Francisco Conference when the UN Charter was drafted in 1945. She was the 1946 Venezuelan delegate to the Inter-American Commission of Women as well as the 1947 delegate to the Primer Congreso Interamericano de Mujeres (First Inter-American Congress of Women) and delegate to the UN Commission on the Status of Women during the drafting of the Universal Declaration of Human Rights.
