= Enriqueta de Landaeta =

Venezuelan professor and activist

Enriqueta de Landaeta was a Venezuelan professor and teacher who was an active suffragette and proponent for women's education. From 1936 to 1938 she was the Director of the Escuela Federal Jesús María Sifontes in Guaicaipuro, Venezuela, which was one of the first primary schools opened for girls in 1917. By 1947 she was in Caracas and teaching World History and Geography and American History, which she continued until at least 1955. In 1959, with the founding of Liceo Santiago Key Ayala, Landaeta became assistant principal. The school, located in Caracas was one of the first institutions to offer Bachelor of Science degrees to women. In 1947, Landaeta attended the Primer Congreso Interamericano de Mujeres which was a women's conference sponsored by the Women's International League for Peace and Freedom (WILPF) to promote women's dialogue on world affairs and promote recognition of women's civil rights.
