= Ofelia Uribe de Acosta =

Colombian suffragist (1900–1988)

- Born: Ofelia Uribe Durán; December 22, 1900; Oiba, Colombia
- Died: August 4, 1988 (aged 87); Bogotá, Colombia
- Education: Escuela Normal de San Gil
- Occupations: Suffragist; teacher; writer
- Spouse: Guillermo Acosta (m. 1926)

Ofelia Uribe de Acosta (December 22, 1900 – August 4, 1988) was a Colombian suffragist, teacher and writer. She was known for advocating for women's civil and political rights.

== Early life and education ==
Acosta was born Ofelia Uribe Durán on December 22, 1900 in Oiba, Colombia to Juan Bautista Uribe Durán and Josefa Durán Gómez. Both of Acosta's parents were Primary school teachers who were associated with the Colombian Liberal Party.

After finishing primary education in Socorro, Acosta's family relocated to San Gil where she enrolled at the Normal School of San Gil (Spanish: Escuela Normal de San Gil). Acosta graduated with her teaching qualification in 1917.

== Career ==
In 1930, Ofelia presented at the Fourth International Women's Conference in Bogotá to advocate for rights for married women. Women were not allowed to vote or create contracts. Married women were under the protection (guardianship) of their spouses and their possessions went to their husbands.

In 1944 and 1955 respectively, she founded, edited, directed and distributed two political newspapers, the first called Agitacion Femenina (Feminist Movement, on behalf of Union Femenina de Colombia) and the second called Verdad (Truth).

In 1963 she published the book Una voz insurgente (An Insurgent Voice).

Acosta died on 4 August 1988 in Bogotá.

== Personal life ==
In 1926, Acosta married the lawyer Guillermo Acosta, the nephew of Santos Acosta.
