= Blanca Olmedo =

1908 novel by Lucila Gamero

- Author: Lucila Gamero
- Language: Spanish
- Genre: Romantic novel
- Publication date: 1908
- Publication place: Honduras
- Media type: Print

Blanca Olmedo is perhaps the best known novel of the noted Honduran novelist Lucila Gamero. A romance novel, published at a time when the trend for romantic literature had fallen out of fashion in Central America, it was completed in 1903 and published in 1908. It is considered to be one of the most important novels in Honduran literature in the early twentieth century. It is unusual given that it was written by a female writer who was critical of the corrupt establishment in Honduras.
