= Honduran literature =

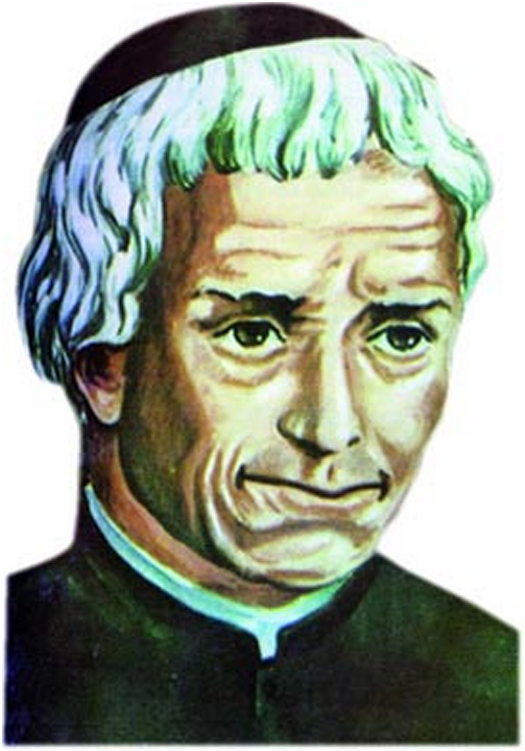
José Trinidad Reyes

Honduran literature describes the literature birthed out of Honduras. The literary history of Honduras intersects with aspects of political and socioeconomic atmosphere that has long been prevalent in Honduran history. In the Handbook of Latin American Literature, Salgado claims that the birth of Honduran literature begins with Fray Jose Trinidad Reyes, who founded the first University of Honduras. The proliferation that was seen in other Central American countries did not appear in Honduras. Furthermore, because the country was under political unrest during much of its history a great deal of the literature remains unpublished and thus, unknown.

In fact, Romanticism reaches Honduras at a later date than most other literature in the world, appearing in late nineteenth century and is seen in the work of Ramon Rosa. Once Romanticism moves into Honduras, the country's literature begins to take off. Authors from this time period are: Manuel Molina Vijil, Jose Antonio Dominguez, and Carlos Federico Gutierrez, who was the author of the first Honduran novel titled Angelina (1898). Influenced by the rest of Spanish America, Honduran literature experiments with Modernism—authors from this generation include Juan Ramon Molina and Froyolan Turcios. Following this generation of literature was a group of writers who had a creolist style where they searched for a Honduran identity. In addition, creolist authors criticized Honduran politics: Marcos Carias Reyes, Carlos Izaguirre, Jose Fidel Duron, Argentina Diaz Lozano, Arturo Mejia Nieto, and Ramon Amaya Amador. In the following years there emerged several different generations of authors that are distinguished by their similarities and their time periods.

== The Generation from the Dictatorship/The Generation of 35 (1933–1949) ==
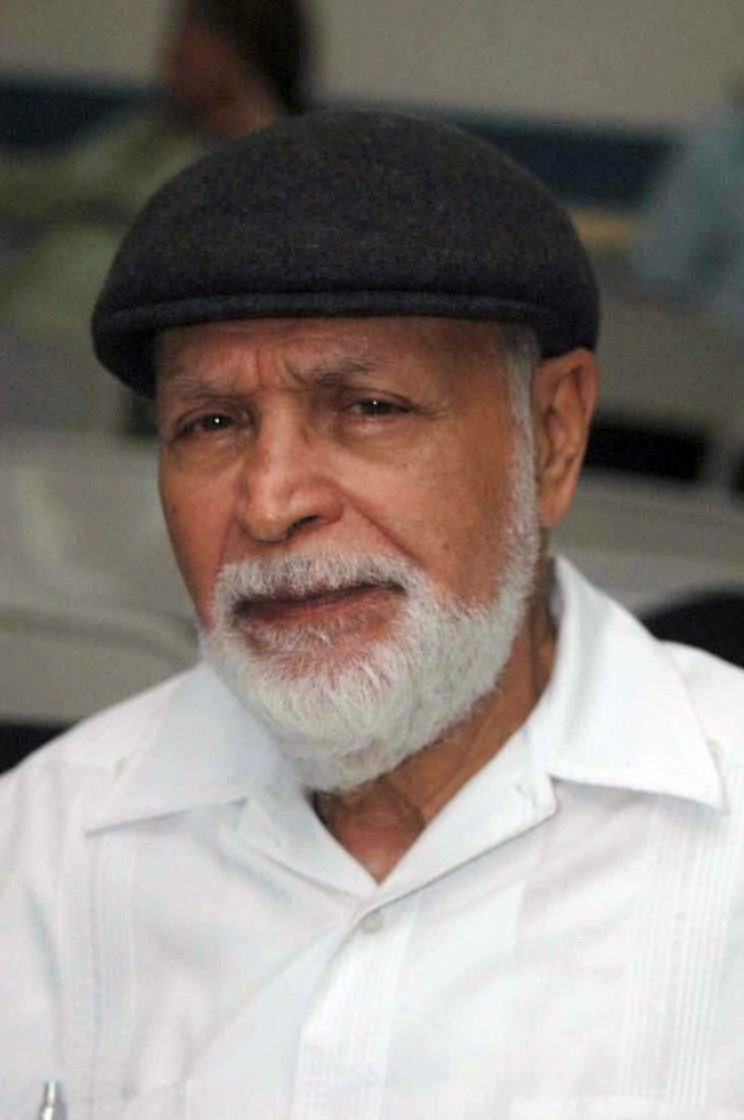
Roberto Sosa

Honduran culture throughout the 1930s to the 1950s centralized around the Tiburcio Carias Dictatorship. Within this political climate emerged the Generation of Authors from Honduras named "The Generation from the Dictatorship/The Generation of 35" named specifically after the time period. Unlike earlier authors from Honduras, this generation of authors connected with the reality of the Honduran everyday lives living in a society centralized on a political economy dominated by a foreign capitalist monopoly. During this historical period the Honduran economy was run by banana plantations. Consequently, much of the writing from this time period was influenced by this socioeconomic atmosphere. Specifically, this generation of authors was said to be born from Honduran magazine titled Tegucigalpa ran by Alejandro Castro. Author's from this generation are described by their lyrical tone and political themes.

Author's from the Generation from the Dictatorship include: Daniel Lainez, Jacobo Carcamo, Claudio Barrera, Constantino Suasnavar, Alejandro Castro h., Matias Funes, Miguel R Ortega, Oscar A. Flores, Raul Giberto Trochez, Enrique Gomez, Marcos Carias Reyes, Clementina Suarez, and Argentina Diaz Lozano.

== The Founders of the New Literature/ The Generation of 50/Vanguard Generation ==
In the post Tiburcio Carías Andino Dictatorship the historical-social climate did not change drastically, but the atmosphere in Honduras did experience a shift. With this new cultural shift, there was birthed a new generation of authors. Although there was not united by a common thread of themes throughout their work there was a common theme of new literature. For this reason, the group was considered to be Vanguard as they began to break previous molds for literature in Honduras.

Being influenced by the General strike of 1954 this generation of authors shone light on a new group of people—the working class—lending to the group also being referenced as the "Social Realism" writers. This shift in writing was seen throughout Latin America all of which were named differently accordingly.

The new emergence of authors from this generation are as follows: Antonio Jose Rivas, Pompeyo Valle, Roberto Sosa, Nelson Merren, Oscar Acosta, Marcos Carias, Francisco Salvador, Saul Toro, Ramon Oqueli, Hector Bermudez Milla, Oscar Castaneda Batres, Felipe Elvir Rojas, David Moya Posas, Hector Bermudez Milla, Jaime Fontana, Miguel R Ortega, Filadelfio Suazo, Angel Valle, Justiniano Vasquez, and Armando Zelaya.

== La Generacion de La Guerra/ The Generation from the War ==
Within the time period of the Founder of the New Literature there existed a separate group of authors. These authors claimed to break from the previous styles of writing from their predecessors. El Heraldo explains that during this time the authors no longer wrote about the rural life of Honduras which dominated much of the earlier generations of writing.

This generation of authors occurred after the Football War (1969) between Honduras and El Salvador. This generation of literature was consequently named after this historical event that impacted Honduran society. Emerging from a state of conflict Bahr explains that the generation hopes to break from the traditional form of literature to theater, narrative, and essay.

Major authors from this generation include: Eduardo Bahr (1940), Julio Escoto (1944), and Rigoberto Paredes (1948).

== The New Generation ==
Although not directly influenced by a political event, during the late eighties and early nineties there emerges yet another generation of authors. The new generation of authors, which began to include more women, begins to question and write about machismo in the Honduran culture. Julio Escoto details that writers began to question their sexual liberties, and political and social independence This generation of authors no longer chooses to limit themselves and write about all aspect of social relations encountered in the human existence.

Authors from this period include: Helen Umaña, Maria Eugenia Ramos (1959), Galel Cardenas (1945), Jose Luis Oviedo, Juana Pavon, Jose Adan Castelar, Leticia de Oyuela, Jose Antonio Funes, Marta Susana Prieto, Fabricio Estrada, Giovani Rodriguez, Martha Isabel Alvarado Watkins, Lety Elvir, Jorge Martínez Mejía, Mayra Oyuela, Salvador Madrid, Samuel Trigueros, Cesar Indiano, Albany Flores Garca, Martín Cálix, Armida García, Kay Valle, Kris Vallejo, Óscar Estrada, J.H. Bográn, Armando Maldonado, Rebeca Becerra, Óscar Flores, Dennis Arita, Kalton Harold Bruhl, Javier Vindel, Rolando Kattán y Javier Suazo Mejía, entre otros.

== Contemporary Honduran Poetry by Women ==
Although having been repeated from other generations of authors, these women fit into a category of their own. Many of the women of this generation of poets discuss their connection with their homelands. In addition, they discuss the themes of motherhood, power, among many other varying topics throughout their poetry.

Contemporary female poets include: Aida Sabonge, Alejandra Flores Bermudez, Amanda Castro, Armida Garcia, Blanca Guifarro, Claudia Torres, Debora Ramos, Elisa Logan, Francesca Randazzo, Indira Flamenco, Juana Pavon, Lety Elvir, Maria Eugenia Ramos, Mirna Rivera, Normandina Pogoada, Raquel Lobo, Rebeca Becerra, Sara Salazar, Waldina Mejia, Xiomara Bu, and Yadira Eguiguren.
