= Helena Leiva de Holst =

Honduran socialist (1897–1978)

- Born: Helena Leiva Ferrera; 5 October 1897; Santa Cruz de Yojoa, Cortés Department, Honduras
- Died: 12 August 1978 (aged 80); San Pedro Sula, Cortés Department, Honduras
- Years active: 1940s-1960s
- Known for: harboring Che Guevara

Helena Leiva de Holst (1897–1978) was a Honduran socialist who traveled to both China and the Soviet Union to study Marxism. Her leftist politics caused her to be exiled to Guatemala, where she participated in feminist causes. In the 1950s, Che Guevara lived with her and dedicated some of his poetry to her. When the United Fruit sponsored coup d'état overthrew Guatemalan president Jacobo Árbenz, Leiva was exiled to Mexico. She finally was able to return to Honduras in the late 1960s.

== Biography ==
Helena Leiva Ferrera was born on 5 October 1897 in Santa Cruz de Yojoa, Cortés Department, Honduras to Emilio Leiva and Florinda Ferrera. Leiva was the granddaughter of Honduran president Ponciano Leiva. As a child, she moved to San Pedro Sula for her studies and it was there that she married a German businessman, Henry Holst. Because of her leftist political views, Leiva was forced into exile in Guatemala. Leiva had traveled to both China and the Soviet Union to study Marxism and in addition was a supporter of feminist causes, attending the Primer Congreso Interamericano de Mujeres held in Guatemala City in 1947. She was also one of the leaders of the Alianza de Mujeres (Alliance of Women).

Leiva continued with her leftist activities, providing lodging for Che Guevara, who was so taken with her that he described her philosophy as "close to communism" and dedicated a 1954 poem, "Invitación al camino" to her. In mid-July, 1954, she was arrested during the United Fruit coup d'état against Guatemalan president Jacobo Árbenz and was exiled to Mexico. After many years of living in exile, she finally was able to return home and lived in San Pedro Sula for the remainder of her life.

Leiva died on 23 August 1978 in San Pedro Sula, Cortés Department, Honduras.
