= Vaginal foreign body =

Foreign body in the vagina

Vaginal foreign body refers to the presence of a foreign object or substance within the vagina. This condition is seen across all age groups but is more common in children and women of reproductive age. The foreign bodies can range from retained tampons to objects inserted for sexual or other purposes. Vaginal foreign bodies are a relatively common presentation in gynecological and emergency medicine. While some cases are accidental, others may be due to curiosity, sexual activity, or abuse, especially in children. The condition can lead to various complications if not addressed promptly.

== Causes ==
=== In children ===
The most frequently encountered foreign object is toilet paper, but items like small toys, hair bands, and paper clips are also not uncommon. Often, there's no medical history of the foreign object's insertion.

=== In adults ===
In adults, common causes include forgotten tampons or contraceptives and objects used during sexual activities. Occasionally, foreign bodies may be a result of sexual assault.

== Symptoms ==
Foreign objects in children's vaginas can lead to acute or recurrent vulvovaginitis, sometimes accompanied by bleeding. In adults, symptoms may include abnormal vaginal discharge, odor, bleeding, pain, or urinary discomfort.

== Diagnosis ==
Visualisation of the foreign body during a physical examination (with the child in a knee-chest position) confirms the diagnosis. Vaginoscopy, if tolerated, can be conducted in-office; otherwise, an examination under anesthesia might be necessary. Vaginal button batteries show up as radio-opaque, circular items on X-ray.

== Treatment ==
The primary treatment involves the careful removal of the foreign body, usually in a clinical setting. The method of removal depends on the size, shape, and nature of the object, as well as the patient's symptoms.
