= Marta Susana Prieto =

Honduran writer

- Born: Marta Susana Prieto de Oviedo; 1944 (age 80–81); Puerto Cortés, Honduras
- Occupation: Writer
- Spouse: Adolfo Miralda

Marta Susana Prieto de Oviedo (born 1944) is a Honduran writer who lives in San Pedro Sula.

== Biography ==
Prieto studied Business Administration at the Central American Business Administration Institute (INCAE) and worked at the Chamber of Commerce and Industries of Cortés (CCIC). She directed the Honduran Hotel Association between 1985 and 1990. She was a member of the Chamber of Tourism.

Prieto carried out an important cultural and social management, sponsoring painting, music and lyrics events. She was a founding member of the San Pedro Sula Children's Cultural Center (CCI) and has actively collaborated in the directors of various cultural organizations.

Prieto was part of the editorial board of Thresholds, the supplement of the newspaper Tiempo and has collaborated with the Tragaluz magazine and the Cronopios Supplement writing anthropological and cultural articles,

In 1999, she wrote her first book, the short novel "Melodía de silencios", followed by others that incorporate historical themes from Honduras.

== Bibliography ==
- Melodía de silencios, 1999
- Animalario, 2002
- Memoria de las sombras, 2005
- Buscando el Paraíso, 2010
- El rapto de la Sevillana, 2015
- 100 años haciendo historia
