= Vaginoscopy =

Vaginoscopy is the inspection of the vagina, used most often to assess prepubertal children without damaging the hymen or any other part of the vagina or vulva. A hysteroscope, cystoscope, dedicated vaginoscope, or other irrigating endoscope may be used; a vaginoscope is a distinct instrument from a speculum. Vaginoscopy is performed to biopsy lesions, investigate potential sexual abuse, remove foreign bodies, perform rectovaginal examinations, and drain cysts. Saline irrigation to distend the vagina is often used to maximize visualization.
