= Annalee Stewart =

Annalee Kyger Stewart, 1962

Annalee Stewart (February 17, 1900 – November 1988) was one of the first ordained female ministers of the U.S. Methodist Church and was the first woman to be a guest chaplain for the U.S. House of Representatives. She was a peace activist and served as president of the Women's International League for Peace and Freedom (WILPF) between 1946 and 1950.

== Biography ==
Annalee Hayes Kyger was born on February 17, 1900, in Bloomington, Illinois, to Herbert E. Kyger and Iva Belle Hayes. She graduated from Illinois Wesleyan University in 1921 and went on to study at Boston University School of Theology, Colgate Rochester Theological Seminary, and Union Theological Seminary in New York City. On 17 April 1931 received full ordination as a Methodist clergy, becoming one of the first ordained female ministers of the Methodist Church in the US. In 1924, she became involved with the Women's International League for Peace and Freedom (WILPF), serving in various capacities until the 1960s. She was Chicago chapter president in 1943 and then National President between 1946 and 1950, Legislative Secretary from 1949 to 1964 and again in 1966, and served as Legislative and Branch Liaison between 1964 and 1966.

Stewart became Director of Religious Education at the Centre Methodist Church of Malden, Massachusetts between 1937 and 1943. During World War II, Stewart and her family moved to Chicago and until the early 1950s they traveled back and forth between Washington, D.C. and Chicago. On June 11, 1948, Stewart became the first woman to lead a prayer for the U.S. House of Representatives and as late as 1967 had been the only female guest chaplain of the House. Stewart actively lobbied against war, co-chairing the WILPF Committee to Oppose Conscription of Women for World War II, visiting Congress to speak against the Korean War, as well as the Vietnam War, and calling on scientists to stop germ warfare and nuclear tests, urging total disarmament.

Stewart traveled widely participating in conferences around the world speaking for world peace, attending seven international world congresses and advocating for a strong United Nations. In 1947, she was one of the WILPF delegates to the Primer Congreso Interamericano de Mujeres held in Guatemala City. In the decade after the end of World War II, she made five trips to Europe, traveled to Palestine, traveled throughout the United States, as well as fact finding missions like the 1965 clergy visit to Vietnam and trips to India, Israel, Japan, Poland, and the USSR.

In 1966, Stewart received a Distinguished Alumni Award from Illinois Wesleyan University and received an honorary Doctor of Humanities degree from the school in 1967. She retired in 1970.

Stewart died in November 1988 in Middlesex, Massachusetts. She had been married to Alexander Stewart, who was also a Methodist minister. They had two daughters and a son.
