= Hospital Militar Central Cirujano Mayor Dr. Cosme Argerich =

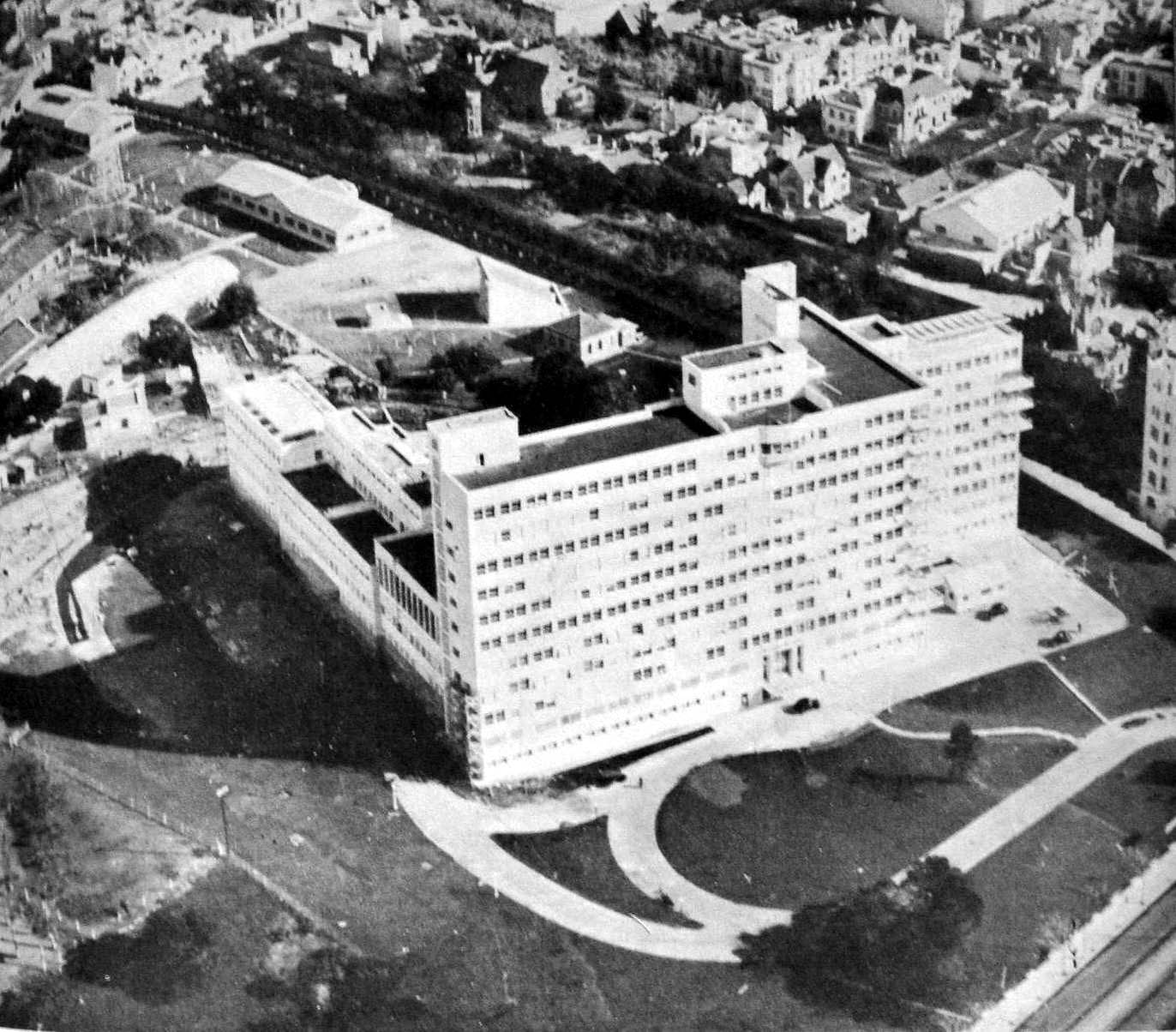
- Aerial view, 1939

Geography
- Location: Palermo, Buenos Aires, Argentina
- Coordinates: 34.571°S 58.437°W

Organisation
- Type: Military hospital

History
- Opened: about 1870

Links
- Lists: Hospitals in Argentina

The Hospital Militar Central Cirujano Mayor Dr. Cosme Argerich (Chief Surgeon Dr. Cosme Argerich Central Military Hospital) also known as Hospital Militar Central (Military Central Hospital) is a hospital owned by the Argentine Army in the city of Buenos Aires, Argentina for the use of military personnel and their families.

== History ==
At the end of the Paraguayan War at the behest of military physicians such as Caupolicán Molina and Ruiz Moreno, who worked at the "Men's general Hospital" and after the raging of the 19th Century yellow-fever epidemic in Buenos Aires, they opened the first organized Military Hospital in downtown Buenos Aires, then moved in 1898 to a bigger site and finally replaced in 1939 with the present-day complex.

Construction of the present-site was started on 15 September 1936 during the presidency of General Agustín Pedro Justo, who besides being in the army was a civil engineer. The project was started by then Director General of Health Services, General (medical Corps) Dr. Eugenio A. Galli and Regimental Surgeon Dr. Luis E. Ontaneda. The hospital opened on 27 May 1939 with a ceremony presided by then-president General Roberto M. Ortiz. The hospital is named after Argentina physician Dr. Cosme Argerich.
