= Argentina Díaz Lozano =

Honduran journalist and novelist (1912–1999)

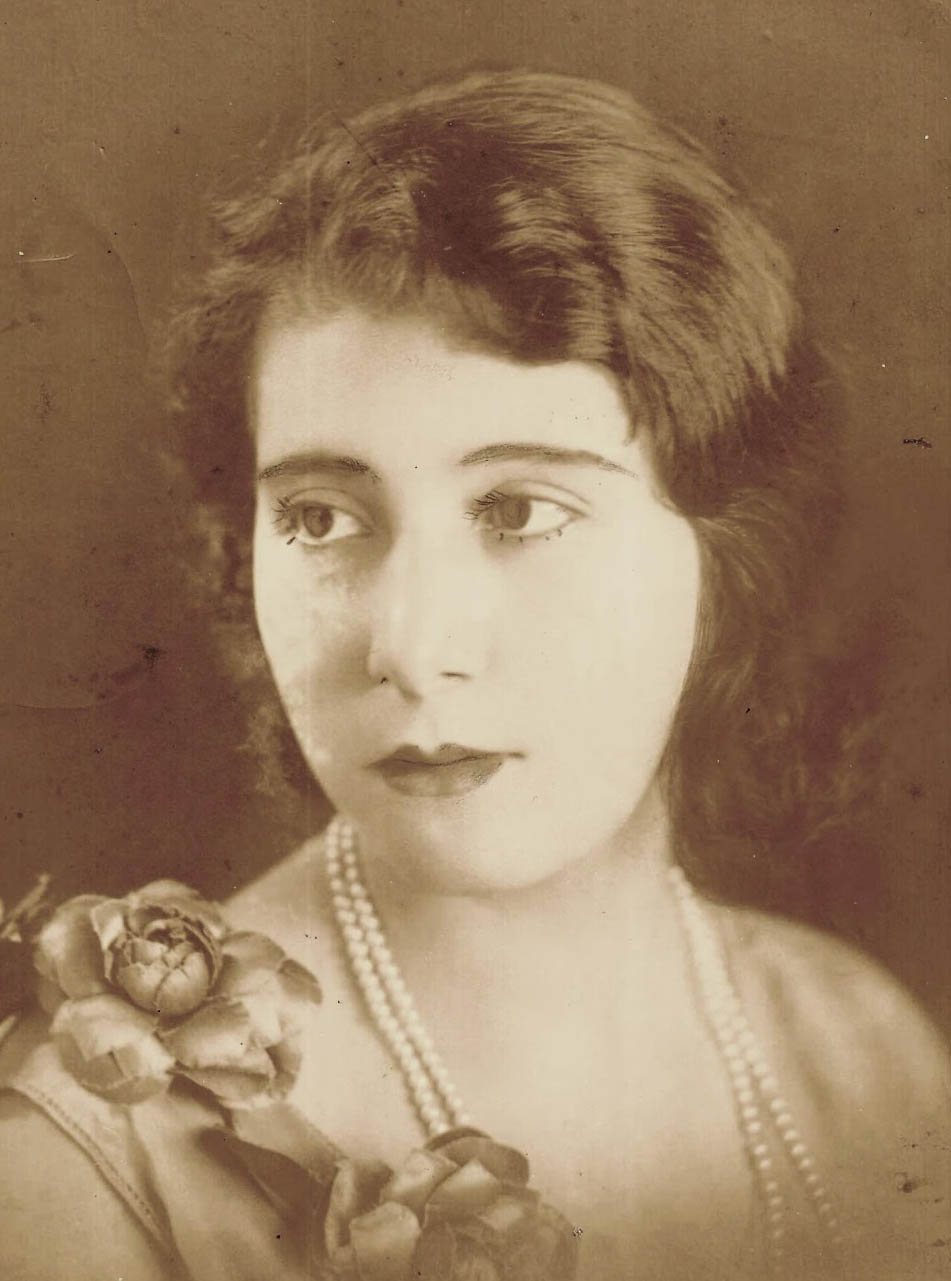
- Argentina Díaz Lozano, 1932
- Born: Argentina Bueso Mejía; 5 December 1912; Santa Rosa de Copán, Honduras
- Died: 13 August 1999 (aged 89); Tegucigalpa, Honduras
- Occupations: Writer, women's rights activist, suffragette, diplomat
- Years active: 1943–1999

Argentina Díaz Lozano (December 5, 1912 – August 13, 1999) was the pseudonym for the Honduran writer Argentina Bueso Mejía. She was a journalist and novelist, who wrote in the romantic style with feminist themes. She won numerous awards for her books, including the Golden Quetzel from Guatemala, the Honduran National Literature Prize Ramón Rosa" and the "Order Cruzeiro do Sud" from Brazil. She was admitted to the Academia Hondureña de la Lengua and is the only Central American woman whose work has officially contended for a Nobel Prize for Literature.

== Biography ==
Argentina Bueso Mejía's year of birth has been cited as 1909, 1910 and 1917, but is generally accepted as 15 December 1912 in Santa Rosa de Copan, Honduras to businessman Manuel Bueso Pineda and Trinidad Mejía. She attended Coligio María Auxiliadora in Tegucigalpa between 1925 and 1928 and then completed her secondary education at Holy Name Academy in Tampa, Florida. In 1929, she married Porfirio Díaz Lozano and adopted both of his surnames as her literary name. She graduated with a degree in journalism from the Universidad de San Carlos de Guatemala.

She began writing for newspapers while studying in Guatemala and published articles in Diario de Centroamerica, La Hora, El Imparcial, and Prensa Libre and at one point had a weekly column called "Jueves Literarios" (Literary Thursdays) that was carried in several Guatemalan papers. Her first novel, Perlas de mi rosario (cuentos) was published in 1930 and followed by several others. Her first important recognition came in 1944 with Peregrinaje (Pilgrimage), which won first literature prize in Latin American in a contest sponsored by the Pan-American Union and the publisher Farrar & Rinehart. The prize resulted in her book being published in Spanish in Santiago, Chile and in English by Farrar & Rinehart under the title Enriqueta and I, as well as European recognition. Between 1945 and 1955, Díaz Lozano worked in the library of the Institute of Anthropology and History at the University of San Carlos. She was also involved in feminist causes, attending the Primer Congreso Interamericano de Mujeres on behalf of the Comités Pro Paz y Libertad (Committee for Peace and Liberty) of San Pedro Sula and Tegucigalpa.

Around 1951, she divorced her first husband, keeping his name, and sometime between 1952 and 1954, she married Guatemalan diplomat Darío Morales García. In 1956, Díaz Lozano accompanied Morales to Belgium, where Morales took up a post at the Consul of Guatemala in Antwerp, Belgium. While in Europe, she studied Fine Arts at the University of Utrecht in the Netherlands and published several books in French. Her book Mansión in la bruma was adapted for the stage by Ligia Bernal de Samayoa. In 1964, the book won a Golden Quetzal from Guatemala as best book of the year and Díaz Lozano returned from Belgium to be appointed Cultural Attaché for the Honduran Embassy in Guatemala.

In 1967 and 1968, she conducted a series of interviews with the vice president of Guatemala Clemente Marroquín Rojas and though she did not necessarily agree with his politics she found him an interesting personality. In 1968, she published a biography of him and was awarded the Honduran National Literature Prize "Ramón Rosa" and admitted to the Academia Hondureña de la Lengua, as well as receiving the "Order Cruzeiro do Sud" from the government of Brazil. In 1971, she began the magazine Revista Istmeña and serialized a novel, Su hora under the pseudonym "Suki Yoto". In 1986, the novel would be published under the name Caoba y orquídeas: novela. In 1973, she published Aquel año rojo: novela and in June of that year was nominated as a candidate for the Nobel Prize for Literature. Her nomination was accepted and she was an official candidate for the 1974 award. Díaz Lozano is the only Central American Woman whose works have been an official candidate for the Nobel Prize of Literature.

After the 1976 Guatemala earthquake, Díaz Lozano made her home in Antwerp and traveled back and forth between Belgium and Guatemala, continuing to publish into the 1990s. In February, 1999 she decided to make a trip to visit her homeland in Honduras.

Díaz Lozano died on 13 August 1999 in Tegucigalpa, Honduras.

== Awards ==
- 1944: Best Novel, Peregrinaje, Latin American Novel Contest Pan-American Union and Farrar & Rinehart
- 1964: Book of the Year, Mansión in la bruma, Golden Quetzel (Guatemala)
- 1968: Honduran National Literature Prize "Ramón Rosa" and admitted to the Academia Hondureña de la Lengua
- 1968: Order Cruzeiro do Sud, Brazil
- 1974 Considered for a Nobel Prize for Literature

== Publications ==
=== Short stories ===
- Perlas dé mi rosario ("Pearls of My Rosary", 1930)
- Topacios ("Topaz", 1940)

=== Poetry collections ===
- Tiempo que vivir ("A Time to Live", 1940)
- Peregrinaje ("Pilgrimage", 1944)
- Mayapán (1950)
- 49 días en la vida de una mujer ("49 Days in the Life of a Woman", 1956)
- Y tenemos que vivir... ("And We Have to Live...", 1960)
- Mansión en la bruma ("Mansion in the Mist", 1964)
- Fuego en la ciudad ("Fire in the City", 1966)
- Aquel año rojo ("That Red Year", 1973)
- Eran las doce... y de noche ("It Was Twelve O'clock… and Night", 1976)
- Ciudad Errante ("Wandering City", 1983)
- Caoba y orquídeas ("Mahogany and Orchids", 1986)
- Ha llegado una mujer ("A Woman Has Arrived", 1991)

=== Essays ===
- Método de mecanografía al tacto ("Touch Typing Method", 1939)
- Historia de la moneda en Guatemala ("History of currency in Guatemala", 1955)
- Sandalias sobre Europa ("Sandals on Europe", 1964)
- Historia de Centroamérica ("History of Central America", 1964)

=== Biographies ===
- Aquí viene un hombre: biografía de Clemente Marroquín Rojas; político, periodista y escritor de Guatemala ("Here Comes a Man: Biography of Clemente Marroquín Rojas; Politician, Journalist and Writer from Guatemala", 1968)
- Walt Whitman: primer poeta auténticamente americano ("Walt Whitman: First Authentically American Poet", 1976)

== Recording from the Library of Congress ==
Argentina Díaz Lozano reading from her own work (1960).

== Notes ==
1. Her date of birth has been variously cited as 1912, 1910, 1909, but recent findings by her family show she was born on December 5, 1909, and was baptized in Santa Rosa de Copan on September 12, 1912, as Trinidad Mejia.
