= Union Femenina de Colombia =

Colombian women's rights organization

Union Femenina de Colombia (UFC), was a Colombian women's rights organization, founded in 1944. Alongside the Alianza Femenina, it was one of the two big women's organizations campaigning for women's suffrage in Colombia.

The Colombian women's movement had begun in the 1930s. In 1932, married women were granted the right to own property and the right to university education. In 1944, a female lawyer was denied the right to become a judge. This caused the formation of the UFC. The UFC worked for the improvement of women's rights. The members of the UFC mostly consisted of educated middle class and upper class women. Many of them were related or affiliated with male members of the Liberal Party, who supported women's suffrage. The UFC published the women's magazine Agitacion Femenina, edited by Ofelia Uribe, and the radio show Sutilezas. It was also supported by the biggest women's magazine in Colombia, the Letras y Encajes, which was conservative but did support women's suffrage.

Women's suffrage was introduced in Colombia in 1954.
