= Alianza Femenina =

Colombian women's rights organization

Alianza Femenina, was a Colombian women's rights organization, founded in 1945. Alongside the Union Femenina de Colombia, it was one of the two big women's organizations campaigning for women's suffrage in Colombia.

The Alianza Femenina was founded in 1945. Its purpose was to campaign for women's rights, particularly women's suffrage and full citizenship. Its stated purpose was "bringing all Colombian women together around the common goal of getting full citizenship and rights". Many members of the Alianza Femenina were affiliated with socialists, but their purpose was to unite women from all political views.

Women's suffrage was introduced in Colombia in 1954.
