= El hombre que parecía un caballo =

Novel

- Author: Rafael Arévalo Martínez
- Language: Spanish
- Publisher: Ediciones Ayestas, Forgotten Books
- Publication date: 1915
- Publication place: Guatemala
- ISBN: 978-0-483-47873-2

El hombre que parecía un caballo (English: The Man Who Looked Like a Horse) is a story by Guatemalan author Rafael Arévalo Martínez, first published in 1915. It is a pioneering work in the homosexual theme in the Guatemalan literature.

== Synopsis ==
The book is set in the form of a narration, told in the first person. It narrates the desire felt by the narrator in conversation with another character, a poet named Lord of Aretal, also referred to as Lord of the Topaz as he wears jewels consisting of precious stones. The author uses metaphors and psychozoological comparisons establishing parallels between the personality of the characters and animals, in this case, the Lord of Aretal is compared to a horse.

== Premise and reception ==
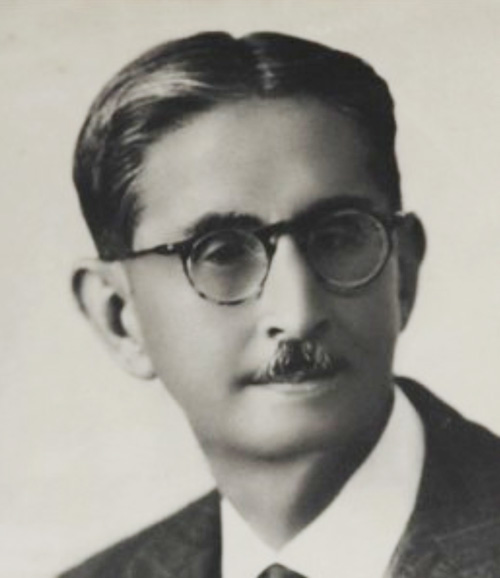
The author, Rafael Arévalo Martínez

There have been several interpretations of the story. As per one interpretation, the story is supposedly based on the interaction between the author Rafael Arévalo Martínez and the Colombian writer Porfirio Barba Jacob. Arévalo wrote the work and gave it to Barba Jacob and asked him not to publish it until his death so as not to make his homosexual preference known to the public. However, on the contrary, Barba Jacob praised the work and released it in public, leading to Arévalo's name getting famous as far as the United States. Hence, Arévalo reissued the entire story without the consent of Barba Jacob, which caused the later to be confirmed as the character of the story. In 1969, American critic Joseph Antony Lonteen went to Guatemala to investigate the work and ended up establishing a relation with Arévalo.

As per Tamar Flores, another line of interpretation of the story is that it is a creative development of Arévalo's own personality, and the opinion is supported by Carlos Wyld Ospina and Daniel Reedy. In later interviews, the author himself claimed that Barba Jacob's claim to be the personification of the Lord of Aretal, and attribution of the story to his own personal introspection and probable relationship with Barba Jacob as "casual".

Antonio Pagés mentions the work had a probable influence from the indigenous communities of Guatemala in which human personality is associated with traits of other animals. The text has also been praised by authors such as Ruben Darío and Gabriela Mistral.

== See also ==
- Los inocentes (book)
