= Rafael Arévalo Martínez =

Guatemalan writer

Rafael Arévalo Martinez
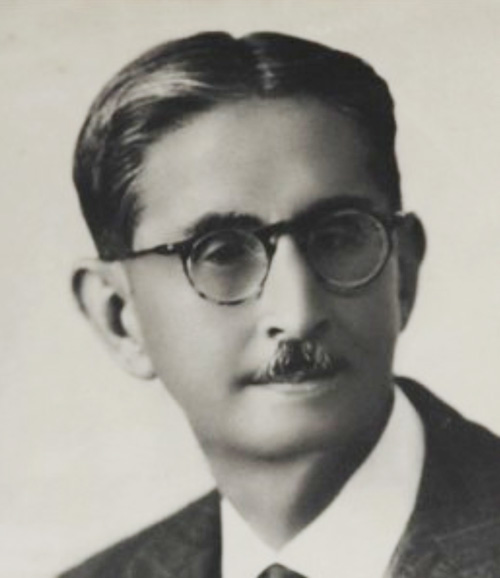
- Arévalo Martinez in the 1930s
- Born: 25 July 1884; Guatemala City, Guatemala
- Died: 12 June 1975 (aged 90)

Rafael Arévalo Martínez (25 July 1884, Guatemala City –12 June 1975, Guatemala City) was a Guatemalan writer. He was a novelist, short-story writer, poet, diplomat, and director of Guatemala's national library for more than 20 years. Though Arévalo Martínez's fame has waned, he is still considered important because of his short stories, and one in particular: The man who resembled a horse and the biography of president Manuel Estrada Cabrera, ¡Ecce Pericles!. Arévalo Martínez was director of the Guatemalan National Library from 1926 until 1946, when he became for a year Guatemala's representative before the Pan American Union in Washington, D.C. He was the political and literary counterpart of his more famous countryman, Nobel Prize winner Miguel Ángel Asturias; while Arévalo Martínez was an unapologetic admirer of the United States, Asturias was a bitter critic of the New Orleans–based United Fruit Company (now part of United Brands Company), which he felt had plundered his country.

== Biography ==
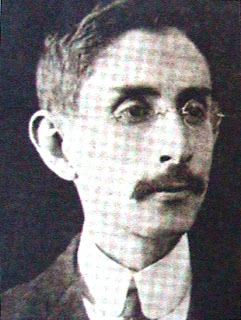
Arévalo Martinez in the 1920s.

Arévalo Martinez was a shy child, prone to sickness but with acute talent. His mother took care of him, given that his father died when he was only four years old. He attended Nia Chon and San José de los Infantes, schools, but could not even finish high school due to his health problems.

Along with artist, writers and poets like Carlos Mérida, Rafael Rodríguez Padilla, Rafael Yela Günther, Carlos Valenti, and Carlos Wyld Ospina among others, worked very closely with Jaime Sabartés, a Spaniard that arrived to Guatemala in 1906 from Barcelona, where he was a close friend of Pablo Picasso; the group was known as the "1910 generation". Arévalo Martínez and the other members of his generation were crucial for the literature and arts of the 20th century in Central America as they abandoned Modernism in search of new trends. Later on Arévalo Martínez created his own style, although there are a number of Guatemalan writers that are grateful for his grammar advice.

Arévalo Martinez worked both prose and poetry. His first literary work appeared in 1905 when his first poem was printed in a newspaper, and in 1908 he published Woman and children for the Electra magazine contest, that he won. In 1911, along with Jaime Sabartés decided to rent with their wives a house to save for both families. With Francisco Fernández Hall in 1913 founded was editor in chief of the magazine Juan Chapín, main outlet for the "1910 generation". He wrote for several newspapers and magazines, both nationally and internationally; In 1916, Arévalo Martínez lived for a while in Tegucigalpa where he was working as editor in chief for El Nuevo Tiempo, but went back to Guatemala a few months later. Over there, he was named secretary of the Central American Office, where he had already worked editing their magazine in 1915. In 1921 he was appointed as correspondent for the Real Academia Española and on 15 September 1922, along with Alejandro Córdova, Carlos Wyld Ospina and Porfirio Barba Jacob founded the newspaper El Imparcial.

He was president of the "Ateneo Guatemalteco", director of the National Library for almost twenty years and in 1945 he was named the Guatemalan detalate before the Pan American Union and director of the Mexican Library in Guatemala.

== Writing ==
Arévalo Martínez's best book of poems was Las rosas de Engaddí (1923; "The Roses of Engaddí"), but he is not remembered as a poet. He published two interconnected utopian novels, El mundo de Los Maharachías (1938; "The World of the Maharachías") and Viaje a Ipanda (1939; "A Voyage to Ipanda"). In the first novel a shipwrecked man named Manuol [sic] finds a civilization of creatures that resemble monkeys but are superior to men. The Maharachías' sensitive tails are almost spiritual. In the second novel the tone is more intellectual and political, and the result is less satisfactory. Arévalo Martínez is remembered mostly for the title story of his collection El hombre que parecía un caballo (1920; "The Man Who Resembled a Horse"), which was once considered the most famous Latin American short story of the 20th century. First published in 1915, the story was so successful that Arévalo made other experiments in the same vein. These "psychozoological stories," as he called them (probably remembering Kipling), involve a dog or a lioness or some other animal. "The Man Who Resembled a Horse" purports to be the satirical portrait of Colombian poet Porfirio Barba Jacob, who is given the character of a blaspheming, egotistical, and amoral man. The story's power lies in the delirious and oblique account of homoerotic desire. The protagonist's resemblance to a horse embraces his graceful, yet brutal sexuality and his total disregard for morality. The story is deliberately decadent, luxuriant in tone, and its version of sexual desire owes much to Friedrich Nietzsche and Sigmund Freud, who were very popular at the time Arévalo Martínez wrote it. Roberto González Echevarría

== List of works ==
=== Narrative ===
- Una vida, 1914
- El hombre que parecía un caballo, 1914
- El trovador colombiano, 1920
- El señor Monitot, 1922
- La oficina de paz de Orolandia, 1925
- El mundo de los maharachías, 1938
- Viaje a Ipanda, 1939
- Manuel Aldano, 1914 (teatro)
- Ecce Pericles (biography of Manuel Estrada Cabrera)

=== Poetry ===
- Maya, 1911
- Los Atormentados, 1914
- Las rosas de Engaddi, 1927
- Por un caminito así, 1947
- "Entregate por entero", 1950

== Notes and references ==
=== Bibliography ===
- Asturias, Miguel Angel (1968). Strong Wind. New York: Delacorte. "Translated by Gregory Rabassa."
- — (1971). The Green Pope. New York: Delacorte. "Translated by Gregory Rabassa."
- — (1973). The Eyes of the Interred. New York: Delacorte. "Translated by Gregory Rabassa."
- Brañas, César (1946). Rafael Arévalo Martínez en su tiempo y en su poesía (in Spanish). Guatemala: Unión Tipográfica.
- Carrera, M.A. (1997). Biografías de siete escritores guatemaltecos (in Spanish). Guatemala: Artemis & Edinter.
- Damisela (n.d.). "Generación de 1910". Damisela blog spot (in Spanish). Archived from the original on 3 February 2007.
- Méndez, Francisco Alejandro (2010). "Rafael Arévalo Martínez". Diccionario de Autores y Críticos de Guatemala (in Spanish). Guatemala: La Tatuana. Archived from the original on 23 October 2010.
- Montenegro, Gustavo Adolfo (2005). "Yo, el supremo". Revista Domingo de Prensa Libre (in Spanish). Guatemala. Archived from the original on 6 October 2014.
- Nájera, Francisco (2003). El pacto autobiográfico en la obra de Rafael Arévalo Martínez (in Spanish). Guatemala: Cultura.
- Salgado, María (1974). "La narrativa de Rafael Arévalo Martínez: el autor frente a su obra" (PDF). Actas (in Spanish). 5. AIH.
- Sitio de Carlos Valenti (n.d.). "Los amigos de Carlos Valenti" (PDF). Carlos Valenti, sitio web oficial (in Spanish). Archived from the original (PDF) on 6 October 2014.

=== Works by Arévalo Martínez ===
- Arévalo Martínez, Rafael (1914). Los atormentados (in Spanish). Guatemala: Unión Tipográfica.
- — (1920). El hombre que parecía un caballo (in Spanish). Guatemala: Imprenta Electra/Ediciones Ayestas.
- — (1945). ¡Ecce Pericles! (in Spanish). Guatemala: Tipografía Nacional.
- — (1922). El señor Monitot (in Spanish). Guatemala: Sánchez y De Guise.
- — (1933). La signatura de la esfinge (in Spanish).
- — (1927). Las rosas de Engaddi (in Spanish).
- — (1940). Los duques de Endor (in Spanish).
