= Jacinto Rodríguez =

Jacinto Rodríguez may refer to:

- Jacinto Rodríguez (footballer) (born 1958), Paraguayan footballer
- Jacinto Rodríguez Díaz (1901–1929), aviation pioneer in Guatemala
- Jacinto Rodriguez (1815–1880), recipient of the Rancho Jacinto Mexican land grant
