= Volcán de Agua =

Stratovolcano in Guatemala

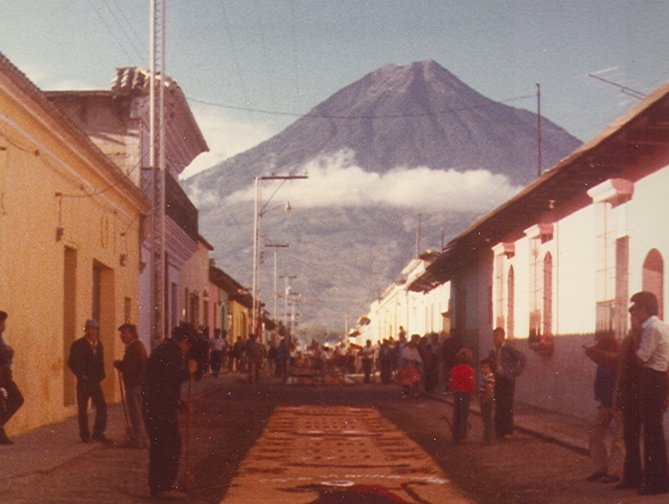
- Volcán de Agua, seen from Antigua, Guatemala, with temporary street carpeting for Easter celebrations in foreground.

Highest point
- Elevation: 3,760 m (12,340 ft)
- Coordinates: 14°27′54″N 90°44′35″W

Naming
- English translation: Volcano of Water
- Language of name: Spanish

Geography
- Location within Guatemala
- Location: Guatemala

Geology
- Mountain type: Stratovolcano
- Volcanic arc: Central America Volcanic Arc
- Last eruption: Late Pleistocene

Volcán de Agua (Spanish for "Volcano of Water", also known as Junajpú by the Maya) is an extinct stratovolcano located in the departments of Sacatepéquez and Escuintla in Guatemala. At 3,760 m (12,340 ft), Agua Volcano towers more than 3,500 m (11,500 ft) above the Pacific coastal plain to the south and 2,000 m (6,600 ft) above the Guatemalan Highlands to the north. It dominates the local landscape except when hidden by cloud cover. The volcano is within 5 to 10 km (3.1 to 6.2 mi) of the city of Antigua Guatemala and several other large towns situated on its northern apron. These towns have a combined population of nearly 100,000. It is within about 20 km (12 mi) of Escuintla (population, c. 150,000) to the south. Coffee is grown on the volcano's lower slopes.

== Brief description and history ==
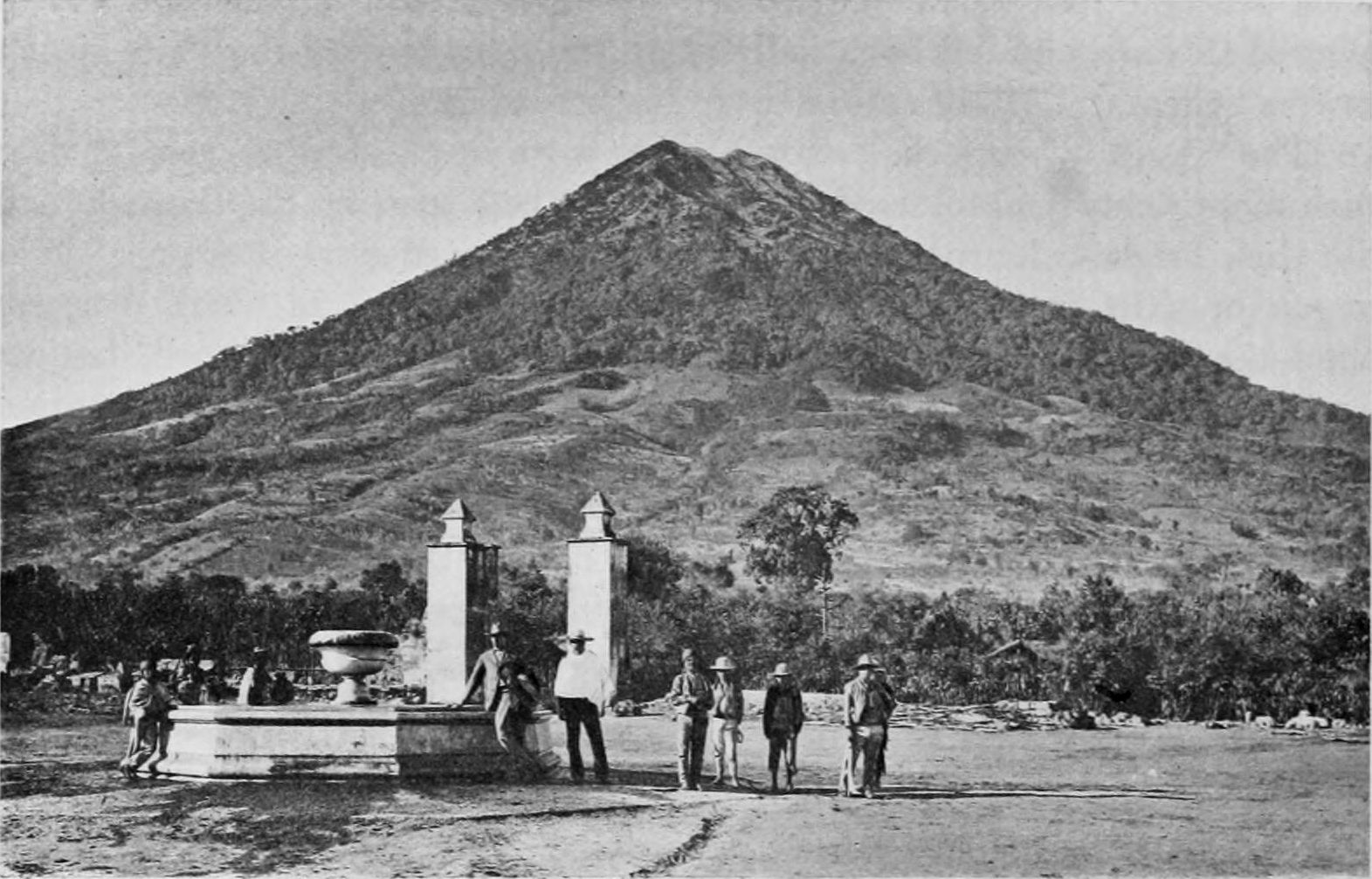
Volcán de Agua as seen from Santa María de Jesús in 1895. Photograph by Alfred Percival Maudslay.

The local Kaqchikel people have always called the volcano Hunapú 'place of flowers' or Jun Ajpu' 'one hunter' (the calendar date for the sacred site; a typical method for naming sacred sites in Mayan cosmovision) in current Kaqchikel orthography. The Spanish conquistadors also called it Hunapú until a lahar from the volcano on September 10, 1541, destroyed the original capital of Guatemala (now known as Ciudad Vieja), after which the capital was moved to Antigua Guatemala. Among the casualties was the governor Beatriz de la Cueva. As the lahar produced a destructive flood of water, this prompted the modern name Volcán de Agua meaning "Volcano of Water", in contrast to the nearby Volcán de Fuego or "Volcano of Fire". The Kaqchikels call Volcán de Fuego Chi Gag (Chi Q'aq' in current Kaqchikel orthography), 'where the fire is'.

The volcano was active in the late Pleistocene between 80,000 and 10,000 years ago, but has not erupted since then. Despite the lack of eruptive activity, the volcano can still produce debris flows and lahars that inundate nearby populated areas. This was proven by the fact that on 11 September 1541, newly founded villa of Santiago de los Caballeros was ruined by a "formidable landslide that came down Volcán de Agua; the mudslide brought along heavy rocks that destroyed part of the buildings and damaged the rest". The city was destroyed and the survivors had no direction, since governor Beatriz de la Cueva died during the disaster, which took place shortly after her husband, Adelantado Pedro de Alvarado, died and she was appointed governor by the Ayuntamiento (City Hall). Beatriz de la Cueva had been beside herself with grief and on 9 September 1541, when she had signed the Cabildo documents, she did so as la sin ventura (the unlucky one), a phrase that turned out to be prophetic. In the aftermath Beatriz de la Cueva was blamed for the disaster as it was considered to be a godly punishment for her sins. Additionally her fate became a cautionary tale about giving women positions in government particularly when many qualified men were available.

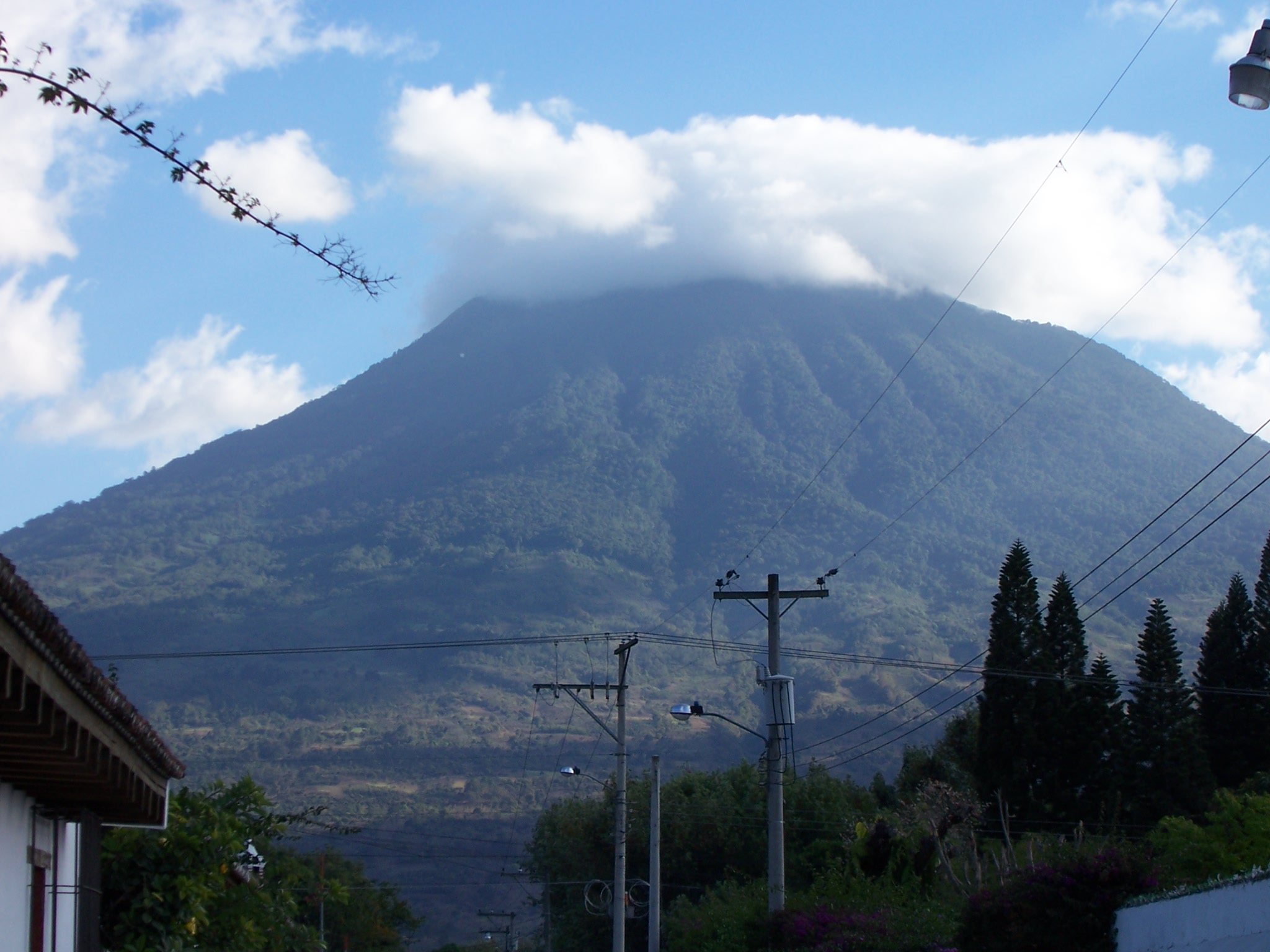
Volcán de Agua as seen from Ciudad Vieja in 2007.

In 1895 Anne Cary Maudslay and her husband, archeologist Alfred Percival Maudslay, visited the Antigua Guatemala region as part of a journey through Guatemala's Maya and colonial archeological monuments, and climbed the Volcán de Agua; in her book A Glimpse at Guatemala she explains that water from the volcano crater could not have destroyed the old Santiago:

The cause of this catastrophe is usually said to have been the bursting of the side of a lake which had been formed in the crater of the extinct Volcán de Agua; but an examination of the crater shows this explanation to be improbable, as the break in the crater-wall is in an opposite direction, and no water flowing from it could have reached the town. Moreover, there is no evidence to show that the deeper portion of the crater, which is still intact, has held water since the reported outbreak. Indeed, an accumulation of water during the exceptionally heavy rain, through some temporary obstruction in one of the deep worn gullies which indent the beautiful slope of that great mountain, and a subsequent landslip would probably account for the damage done without the aid of either an eruption of water from the crater or the supernatural appearances which are duly noted by the old chroniclers.

The volcano was last blanketed by snowfall in January 1967.

The Volcán de Agua was declared a protected area in 1956 and covers an area of 12,600 hectares (31,000 acres).

On 21 January 2012, 12,000 Guatemalans formed a human chain all the way to the peak of Volcán de Agua in a protest against domestic violence.

The spatial configuration of the eruptive apron, drainage gullies, and elevational hazard zones across Volcán de Agua are structured as follows:

- Summit Crater & High-Altitude Ridge (3,200–3,760 m):
  - Geomorphology: Symmetrical, unbreached basaltic-andesite stratovolcano crater measuring ~280 m in diameter and 100 m in depth.
  - Vegetation & Climate: Subalpine scrub, alpine grasses, and sparse pine clusters; subject to rare frost and historical snowfall events.
- Mid-Slope Forest & Drainage Basins (1,800–3,200 m):
  - Hydrogeology: Deeply incised radial gullies prone to rainfall-triggered debris flows and historical lahars.
  - Ecosystem: Dense tropical montane cloud forest providing watersheds for the Panchoy Valley and Escuintla coastal plain.
- Lower Apron & Agricultural Belt (1,500–1,800 m):
  - Settlements: Highly populated municipal aprons including Santa María de Jesús, Ciudad Vieja, and San Juan Alotenango.
  - Agriculture: Shade-grown coffee plantations, maize agriculture, and protected reserve buffer zones (12,600 hectares).

== Gallery ==
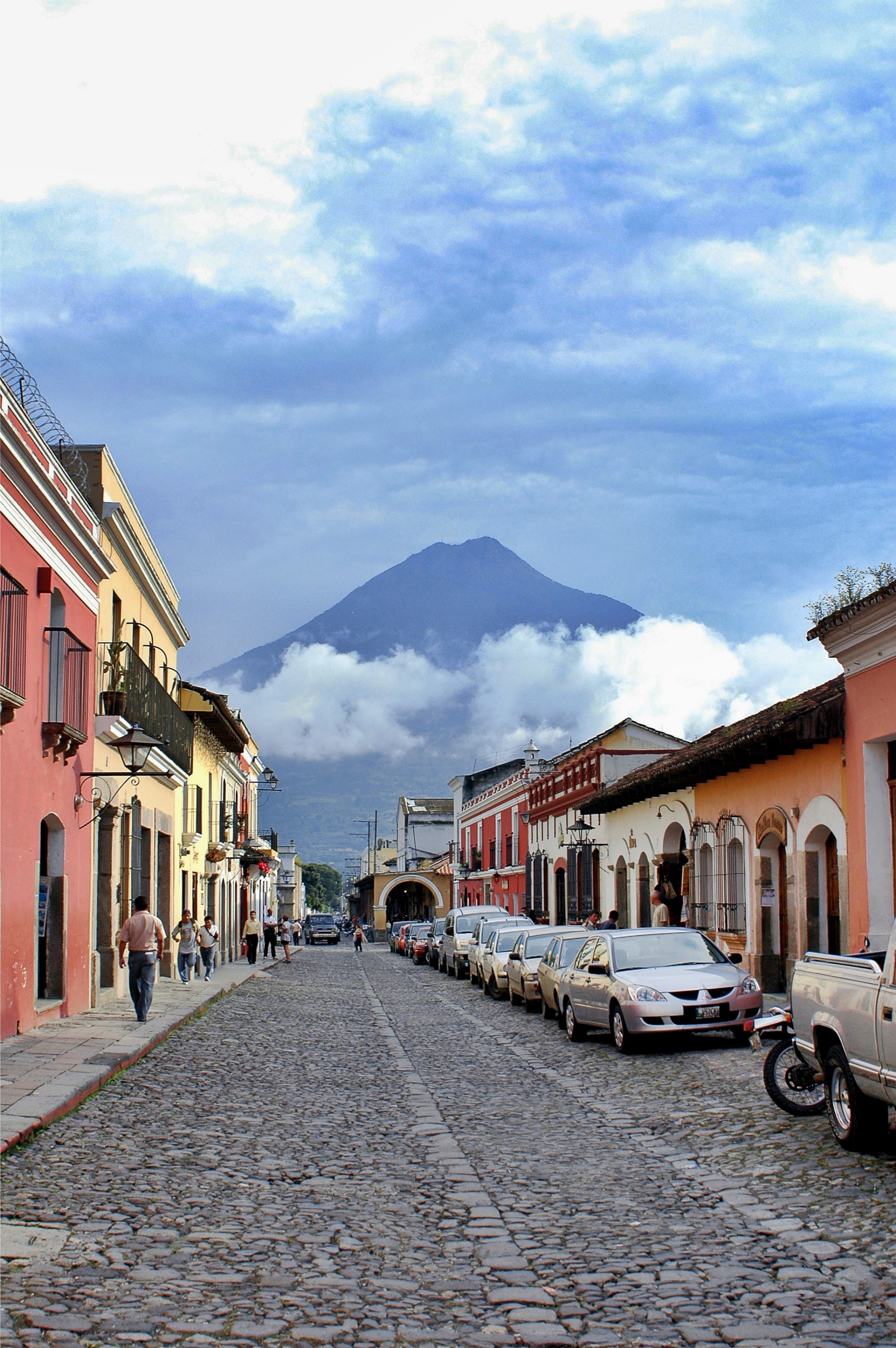
Agua from near Antigua Guatemala's Central Park.

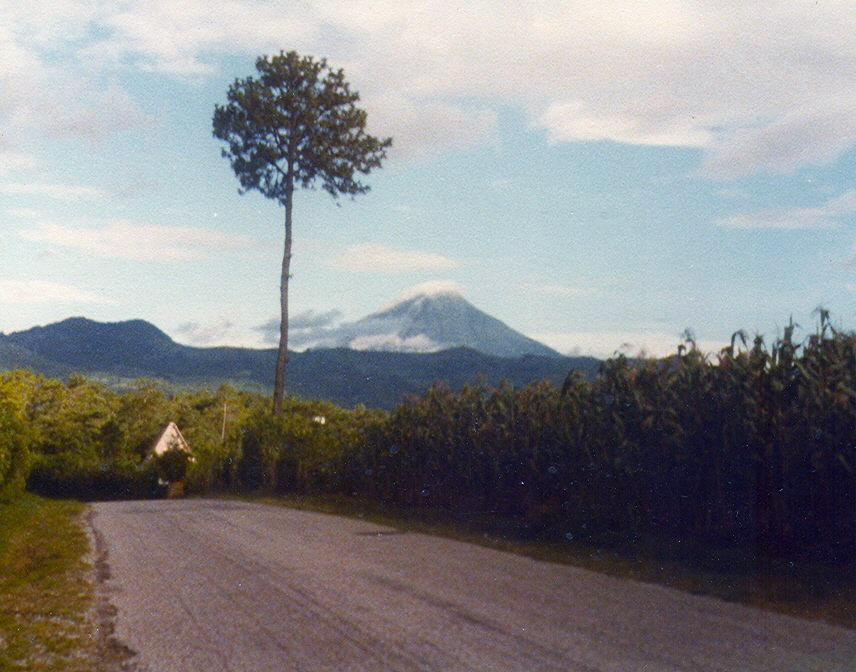
Agua as seen from the road from Chimaltenango to Antigua

Volcán de Agua as seen from Tecpan, Guatemala (80 km (50 mi) away)

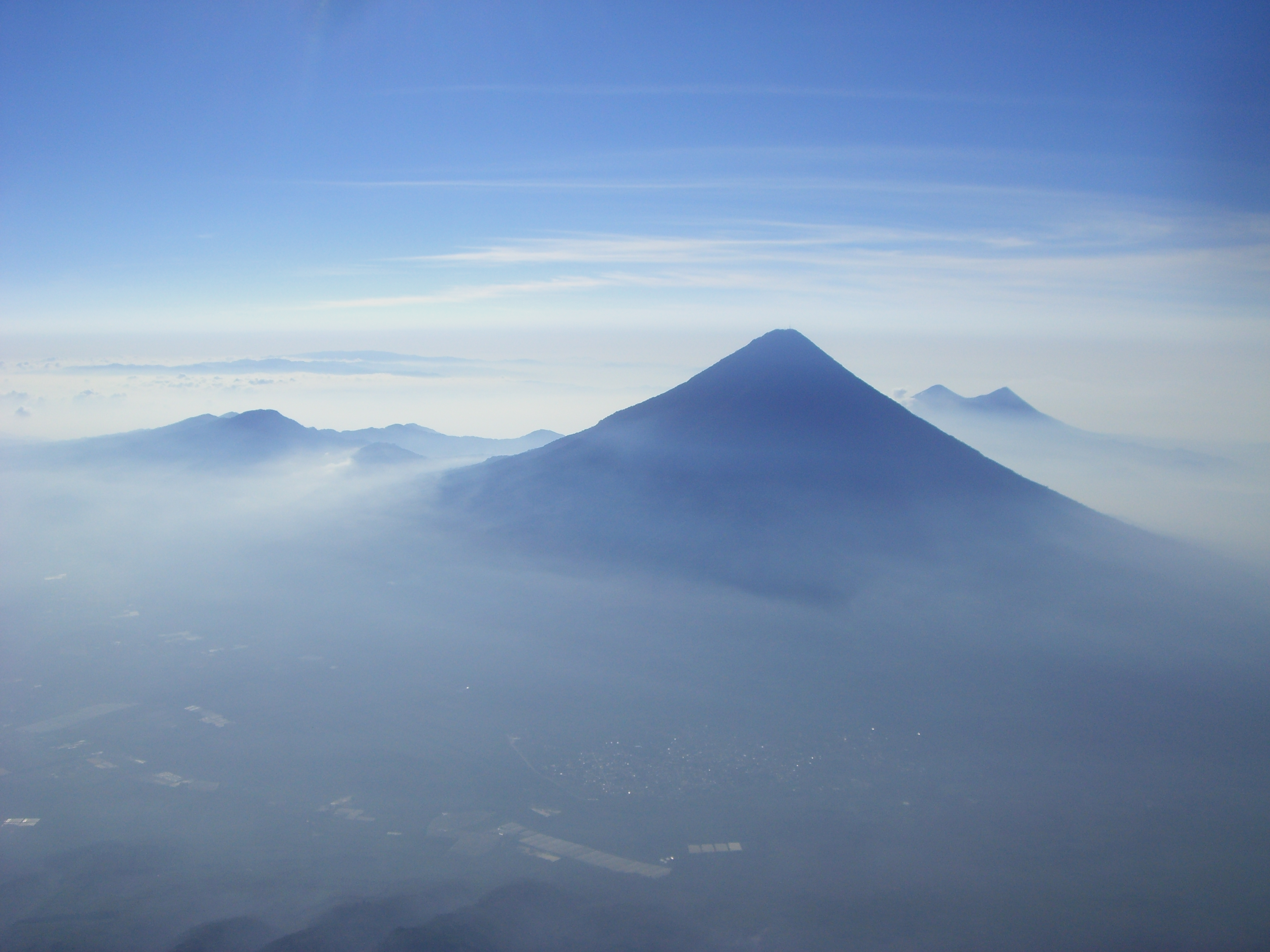
Volcán de Agua exhibits the steep cone shape typical of stratovolcanoes; as seen from Acatenango's Pico Mayor.

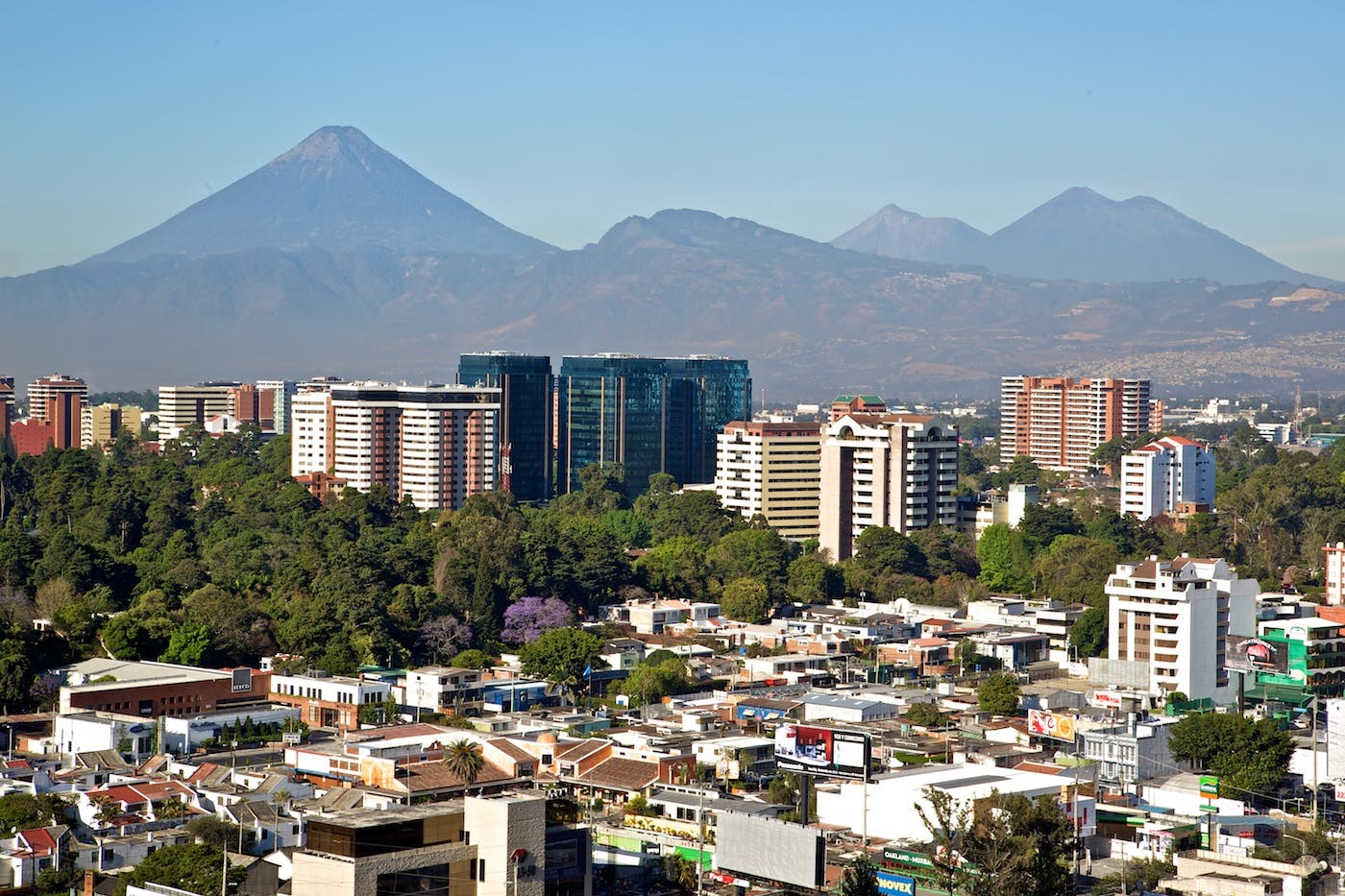
Agua from Guatemala City.

== See also ==
- List of volcanoes in Guatemala
- Mountain peaks of North America
- List of stratovolcanoes

== Notes and references ==
=== Bibliography ===
- Asselbergs, Florine G.L. (2004). Conquered Conquistadors. Mesoamerican Worlds (First ed.). University Press of Colorado. ISBN 978-0870818998.
- Juarros, Domingo (1818). Compendio de la historia de la Ciudad de Guatemala (in Spanish). Guatemala: Ignacio Beteta.
- Maudslay, Alfred Percival; Maudslay, Anne Cary (1899). A glimpse at Guatemala, and some notes on the ancient monuments of Central America (PDF). London, UK: John Murray.
- Milla y Vidaurre, José (1898) [1866]. "La Hija del Adelantado; Memorias de un Abogado (novela histórica)". In Goubaud, E. (ed.). Obras completas de don José Milla (in Spanish) (3rd ed.). Guatemala: E.Goubaud & Cía.
- Recinos, Adrián (1953). The Annals of the Cakchiquels Translated from the Cakchiquel Maya by Adrián Recinos and Delia Goetz. Translated by Goetz, Delia (1st ed.). Norman: University of Oklahoma Press. pp. 3–165.
