= Carlos Mauricio Valenti Perrillat =

French painter active in Guatemala (1888–1912)

Carlos Valenti
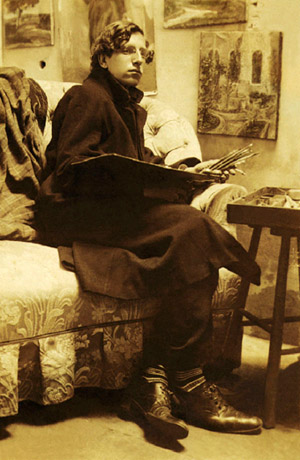
- Valenti in 1912
- Born: Carlos Mauricio Valenti Perrillat; 15 November 1888; Paris, France
- Died: 29 October 1912 (aged 23); Paris, France
- Education: Académie Vitti
- Occupation: Painter
- Movement: Expressionism

Carlos Mauricio Valenti Perrillat (15 November 1888 in Paris – 29 October 1912 in Paris) was a French-born painter, who worked predominantly in Guatemala. An artist with the gift of an undeniable talent who, in spite of living within the moral repressions and strict conventional customs of a Guatemalan time outlined by a dictatorship (Manuel Estrada Cabrera), he was able to develop one of the most important works for art history in the 20th century. He is considered as pioneer of modern Guatemalan art.

== Biography ==
Born in Paris on 15 November 1888, he was the third son of Carlos Valenti Sorie, born in Italy, and Helena Perrillat-Bottonet, born in Le Grand Bornand, Haute-Savoie, France. Valenti arrived in Guatemala together with his mother and two brothers to join his father, who had already been living in the country since 1888. Since he was a child, he stood out as a brilliant and ingenious student, and was awarded a gold medal as the best student. He was the favorite piano student of professor Herculano Alvarado. Later on, as a student at the Fine Arts Academy, he awed professor Santiago González because of his excellent drawing ability.

Valenti was part of a group of artists, poets, and writers like Carlos Wyld Ospina, Rafael Rodríguez Padilla, Rafael Arévalo Martínez, Rafael Yela Günther, the De la Riva siblings and Carlos Mérida, who worked very closely with Jaime Sabartés, Catalan who came to Guatemala from Barcelona, who held a close friendship with Pablo Picasso, and worked as his private secretary since 1935. Among that group of gifted artists, Valenti was like the lighthouse that illuminated everything, who knew how to be a friend and who became one of the masters. At 22, he already had what was called “a style”. His authentic genius expressed itself from his beginnings without hesitation, without wavering. For the time Valenti lived in, his work had an unlimited daring boldness. Since he took the pencil, his stroke was categorical and final. Through his art, Valenti's art expressed a feeling, transmitting his own internal vision. During his learning stage, his work was samples of skill and ability using academic models supported on traditional methods. It is precisely in his oil landscape paintings where we find a gentle Valenti, and in contradiction with a suicidal figure of his last days.

The harmony of his color and the simplification process of his brush strokes recall the spirit that motivated the Impressionists school. His drawings and his hues with uncommon topics for that time define Valenti as a singular artist, in whom the searching spirit of conflicts that originate our existence was born. Some have considered him as the first expressionist in the Guatemalan painting. In 1912, together with painter Carlos Mérida, Valenti traveled to Paris, France, to continue studying painting. Shortly after his arrival, they visited Pablo Picasso to hand him a letter from Jaime Sabartés, referring them to him for his guidance in choosing an academy or a master for their painting classes. That is how both registered at the Académie Vitti, where they became disciples of the Dutch Kees van Dongen and the Spanish Hermenegildo Anglada Camarasa.

In time, Carlos Valenti started to notice that his diabetes, which he had suffered since very young, was affecting his vision more every day. Upon consultation with a specialist in Paris, he ordered him to rest and stay completely away from painting. This situation immersed him in a deep depression when all his plans became frustrated, and when he lost the main reason of his existence: Art.

Two years before he had written: “… there are some among us that have the real faith – Art – for which you have to sacrifice yourself stepping over everything, to whom you have to render homage as a deity, give everything up for it; live only for your work… there, in the canvas, deposit an entire life, all our love; transmit to the painting everything that cannot be explained; live in it, deposit all our being, all the most saintly emotions that the artists’ heart experiences..” His end was tragic, as other artists’ ends were. When he was unable to devote himself totally to his passion – art – on 29 October 1912, he cut short his live with two shots to his chest.

Some of his works belong to the collection of the Museo Nacional de Arte Moderno "Carlos Mérida" in Guatemala City.
