= Ciudad Vieja =

- Municipality and town
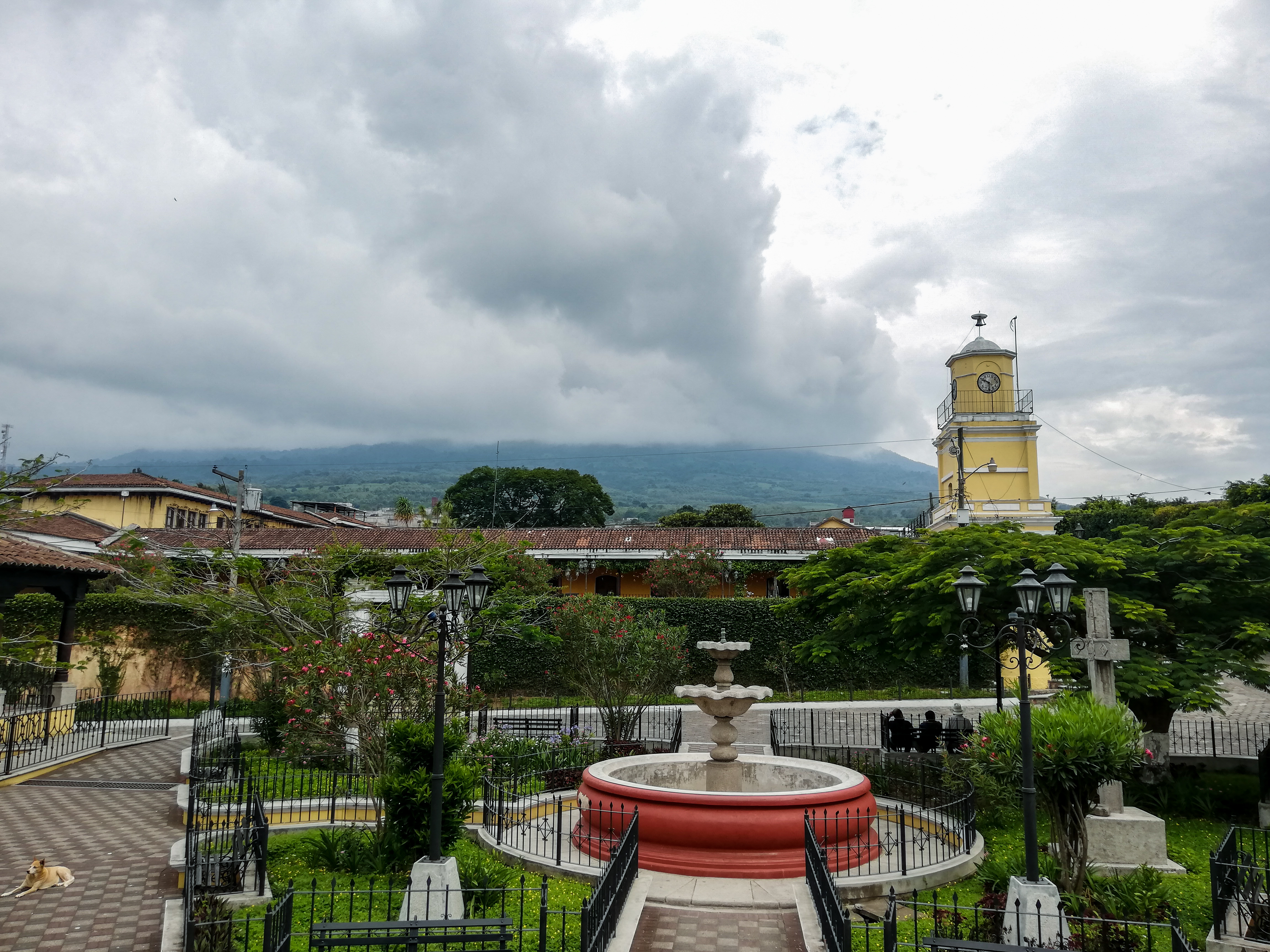
- View of the city

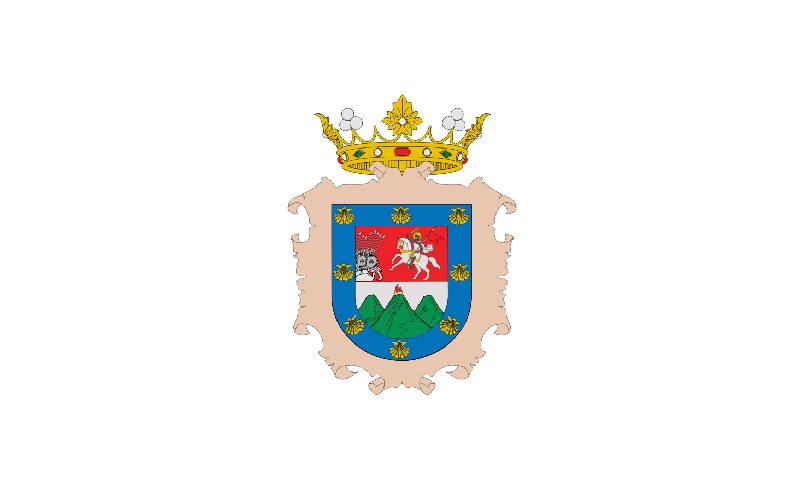
- Flag

- Location in Guatemala Ciudad Vieja (Sacatepéquez Department)
- Coordinates: 14°31′24″N 90°46′0″W
- Country: Guatemala
- Department: Sacatepéquez

Area
  - Total: 26.9 km^{2} (10.4 sq mi)
- Elevation: 1,550 m (5,090 ft)

Population (2018)
  - Total: 33,405
  - Density: 1,240/km^{2} (3,220/sq mi)
- Time zone: UTC-6 (Central Time)
- Climate: Cwb

UNESCO World Heritage Site
- Criteria: Cultural: (ii)(iii)(iv)
- Designated: 1979 (3rd session)
- Part of: Antigua Guatemala
- Reference no.: 65-005

Ciudad Vieja (Spanish pronunciation: [sjuˈðað ˈβjexa]) is a town and municipality in the Guatemalan department of Sacatepéquez. According to the 2018 census, the town has a population of 32,802 and the municipality a population of 33,405. Ciudad Vieja was the second site of Santiago de los Caballeros de Guatemala, the colonial capital of the country.

San Miguel Escobar is the modern name for the district that contains the ruins of the second colonial capital of the Guatemala region. The Spaniards founded their capital here in 1527, after their previous capital at Tecpán Guatemala became untenable. The city was destroyed by a catastrophic lahar from Volcan de Agua in 1541, and the survivors had no choice but to abandon the site. Among the casualties was the governor Beatriz de la Cueva.

== History ==
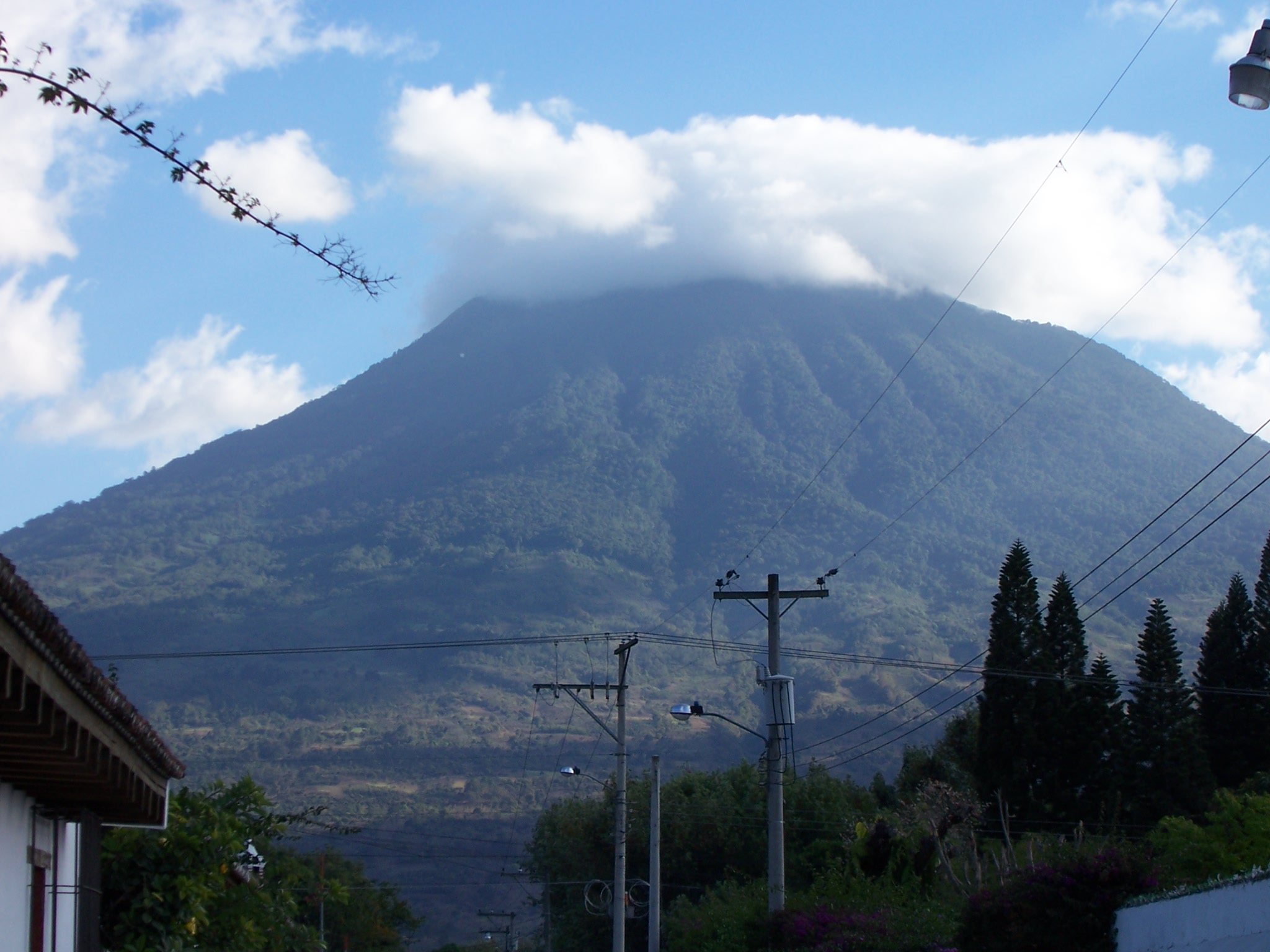
Volcán de Agua as seen from Ciudad Vieja in 2007.

Jorge de Alvarado founded the second capital here for the Captaincy General of Guatemala in 1527; but, according to historian Domingo Juarros, there was already discrepancy on the exact location of the original placement of Ciudad Vieja back in 1818. In his book Compendio de la Historia de la Ciudad de Guatemala (English: Brief history of Guatemala City) he wrote:

But it is noteworthy, that the authors talk with variety on this matters: each one of them talks about this fact based on the system that one follows. [...] Thus, there is a group that says that the Spaniards set the city temporarily in Almolonga, and therefore, the attest to the fact that the City was on the location right to the East, in the place the natives call Tzacualpa, resulting in that the first Almolonga settlement ended up being a barrio in Santiago de los Caballeros de Guatemala. [On the other hand, there is a group that says] that the Spaniards found the city on top of King's Sinacam old court, or Guatemala de los Indios, located in the actual Tzacualpa valley.

Either way, the Cabildo decided a permanent location for the city on the edge of the plain at the foot of the south-west slope of the Volcán de Agua; during the following year this new Santiago was declared to be the capital of the province, and began rapidly to rise in importance.

Juarros described that the settlement could not develop because fourteen years after its foundation it was ruined by a "formidable landslide that came down Volcán de Agua on 11 September 1541; the mudslide brought along heavy rocks that destroyed part of the buildings and damaged the rest". The city was destroyed and the survivors had no direction, since governor Beatriz de la Cueva died during the disaster, which took place shortly after her husband, Adelantado Pedro de Alvarado, died and she was appointed governor by the Ayuntamiento (English:City Hall). Beatriz de la Cueva had been beside herself with grief and on 9 September 1541, when she had signed the Cabildo documents, she did so as "la sin ventura" (English: the hapless one), a phrase that turned out to be prophetic.

Those who survived requested Francisco de la Cueva to gather the Adelantado stick that belonged to his late sister and declared themselves on permanent session on 17 and 18 September 1541, finally appointing bishop Francisco Marroquín and Francisco de la Cueva himself as interim governors.

On 27 September 1541, a commission formed by two auxiliary majors and eleven civilians set out to inspect the surrounding areas and advice on the best location to move the capital city to; the returned after two days, declaring that Tianguecillo Valley was the place to go, and the Cabildo (English: City Hall) issued a decree for everybody to move there. However, before they started to move, engineer Juan Bautista Antonelli, city and villa builder, arrived and recommended to move the city to Panchoy Valley for the following reasons: "there the danger from the volcanos is removed, as they will never be able to flood it, it is guarded at North by the hills that surround it; has plenty of water, with it starting at the top of the hills and then coming down to the valley, and can be tubed and distributed everywhere easily; that land is flat, and it would be easy to build plazas, streets and houses; and so large, that no matter how big the city becomes, it will have up to eight of nine leagues around".

In 1895 Anne Cary Maudslay and her husband, archeologist Alfred Percival Maudslay visited the Antigua Guatemala region as part of a journey through Guatemala's Maya and colonial archeological monuments, and climb the Volcán de Agua; she wrote a book called A glimpse at Guatemala where she explains that water from the volcano crater could not have destroyed the old Santiago: "The cause of this catastrophe is usually said to have been the bursting of the side of a lake which had been formed in the crater of the extinct Volcán de Agua; but an examination of the crater shows this explanation to be improbable, as the break in the crater-wall is in an opposite direction, and no water flowing from it could have reached the town. Moreover, there is no evidence to show that the deeper portion of the crater, which is still intact, has held water since the reported outbreak. Indeed, an accumulation of water during the exceptionally heavy rain, through some temporary obstruction in one of the deep worn gullies which indent the beautiful slope of that great mountain, and a subsequent landslip would probably account for the damage done without the aid of either an eruption of water from the crater or the supernatural appearances which are duly noted by the old chroniclers."

== In literature ==
Guatemalan writer and historian José Milla y Vidaurre wrote his novel La hija del Adelantado using historical elements from the months leading to the destruction of Ciudad Vieja.

== Climate ==
Ciudad Vieja has a subtropical highland climate (Köppen: Cwb).

Climate data for Ciudad Vieja
| Month | Jan | Feb | Mar | Apr | May | Jun | Jul | Aug | Sep | Oct | Nov | Dec | Year |
|---|---|---|---|---|---|---|---|---|---|---|---|---|---|
| Mean daily maximum °C (°F) | 22.7 (72.9) | 23.5 (74.3) | 24.7 (76.5) | 24.9 (76.8) | 24.7 (76.5) | 23.8 (74.8) | 23.6 (74.5) | 23.9 (75.0) | 23.1 (73.6) | 22.8 (73.0) | 23.1 (73.6) | 22.4 (72.3) | 23.6 (74.5) |
| Daily mean °C (°F) | 16.8 (62.2) | 17.3 (63.1) | 18.4 (65.1) | 19.1 (66.4) | 19.5 (67.1) | 19.7 (67.5) | 19.2 (66.6) | 19.2 (66.6) | 18.8 (65.8) | 18.4 (65.1) | 18.0 (64.4) | 16.8 (62.2) | 18.4 (65.2) |
| Mean daily minimum °C (°F) | 10.8 (51.4) | 11.1 (52.0) | 11.9 (53.4) | 13.3 (55.9) | 14.3 (57.7) | 15.3 (59.5) | 14.6 (58.3) | 14.3 (57.7) | 14.4 (57.9) | 13.9 (57.0) | 12.7 (54.9) | 11.3 (52.3) | 13.2 (55.7) |
| Average precipitation mm (inches) | 2 (0.1) | 5 (0.2) | 6 (0.2) | 28 (1.1) | 125 (4.9) | 255 (10.0) | 181 (7.1) | 154 (6.1) | 255 (10.0) | 142 (5.6) | 20 (0.8) | 6 (0.2) | 1,179 (46.3) |
Source: Climate-Data.org

== Geographic location ==
The modern Ciudad Vieja municipality is surrounded by Sacatepéquez Department municipalities:

== See also ==
- Santiago de los Caballeros de Guatemala

== Notes and references ==
=== Bibliography ===
- Asselbergs, Florine G.L. (2004). Conquered Conquistadors. Mesoamerican Worlds (First ed.). University Press of Colorado. ISBN 978-0870818998.
- Juarros, Domingo (1818). Compendio de la historia de la Ciudad de Guatemala (in Spanish). Guatemala: Ignacio Beteta.
- Maudslay, Alfred Percival; Maudslay, Anne Cary (1899). A glimpse at Guatemala, and some notes on the ancient monuments of Central America (PDF). London, UK: John Murray.
- Milla y Vidaurre, José (1898) [1866]. "La Hija del Adelantado; Memorias de un Abogado (novela histórica)". In Goubaud, E. (ed.). Obras completas de don José Milla (in Spanish) (3rd ed.). Guatemala: E.Goubaud & Cía.
