= Guatemalan Air Force =

Air warfare branch of Guatemala's military

- Fuerza Aérea Guatemalteca
- Badge of the Guatemalan Air Force Command
- Founded: 1921; 105 years ago
- Country: Guatemala
- Type: Air force
- Role: Aerial warfare
- Size: 34 aircraft
- Part of: Guatemalan Armed Forces

Insignia
- Roundel

Aircraft flown
- Attack: Pilatus PC-7, A-37 Dragonfly
- Helicopter: Bell UH-1, Bell 212, Bell 412
- Reconnaissance: Bellanca Decathlon
- Trainer: Cessna 206, T-35
- Transport: Cessna 208 Caravan, Basler BT-67

The Guatemalan Air Force (Spanish: Fuerza Aérea Guatemalteca [FAG]) is the aerial warfare service branch of the Armed Forces of Guatemala. The FAG is a subordinate to the Guatemalan Military and its commanding officer reports to the Defence Minister.

== Mission and vision ==
The mission of the Guatemalan Air Force is to "plan and conduct aerial operations to maintain and guarantee the sovereignty of the national air space, through aerial combat, supporting ground units, with the purpose of dissuading, neutralizing or destroying any threat against national objectives, as well as cooperating with the other State institutions to accomplish national efforts."

The vision of the Guatemalan Air Force is "The Guatemalan Air Force will transform its Air Commands, its Training and Professionalization Centers, as well as its Air Reserve, to turn them into units with a greater mobilization, coordination and communication between them, to maximize their administrative and operational capacity, basing on a centralized command, and a decentralized execution, and a series of coordinated efforts, to adequately maintain itself organized, equipped and trained to plan, conduct and execute the actions that the Military Defence of the State imposes on the use of air power, as well as participating in military operations in service to the Nation, such as peace maintenance and/or natural disaster prevention. All of this within the legal statutes of our country, and the search for the most efficient use of assigned resources."

== History ==
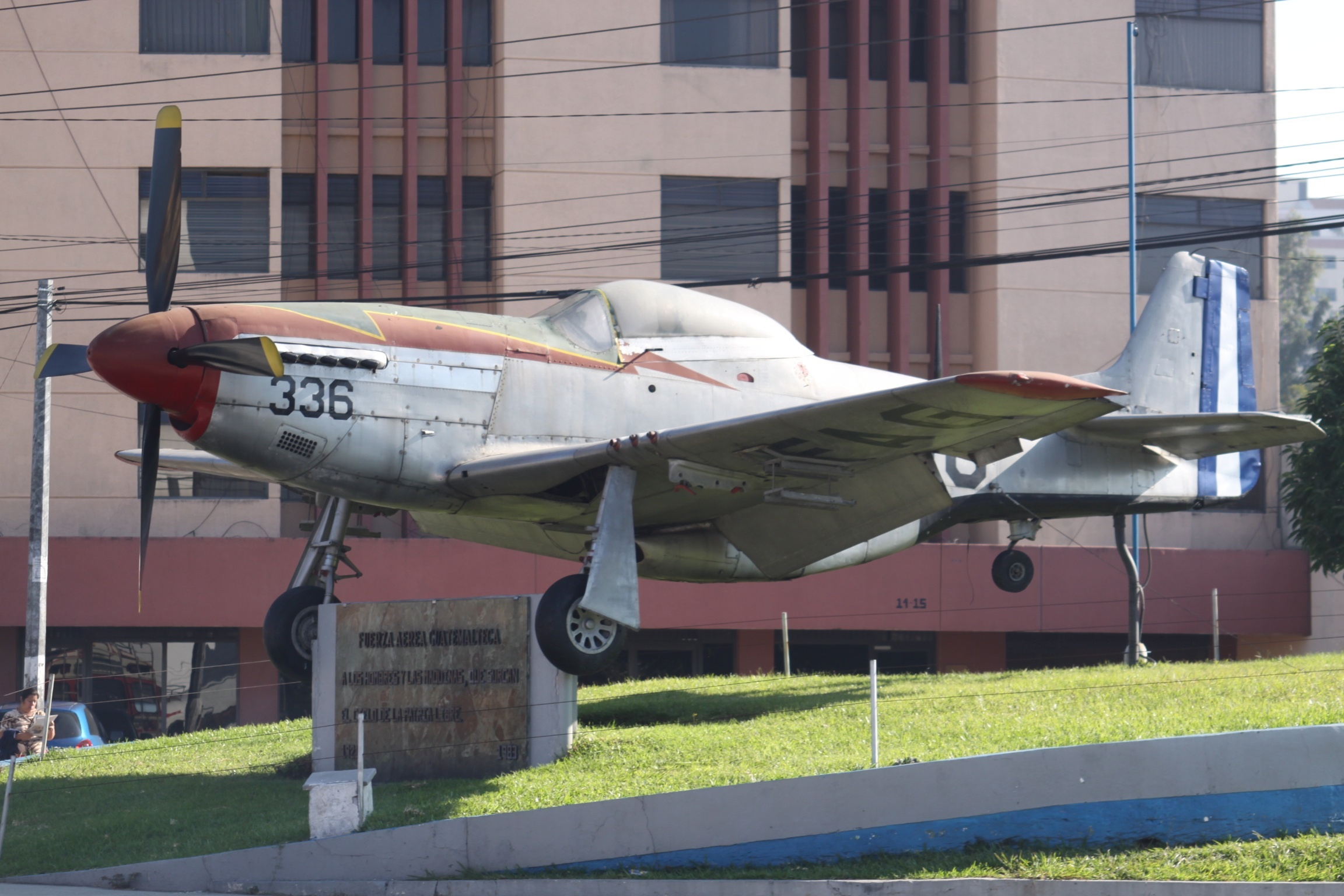
Guatemalan Air Force P-51D at Guatemala La Aurora International surroundings

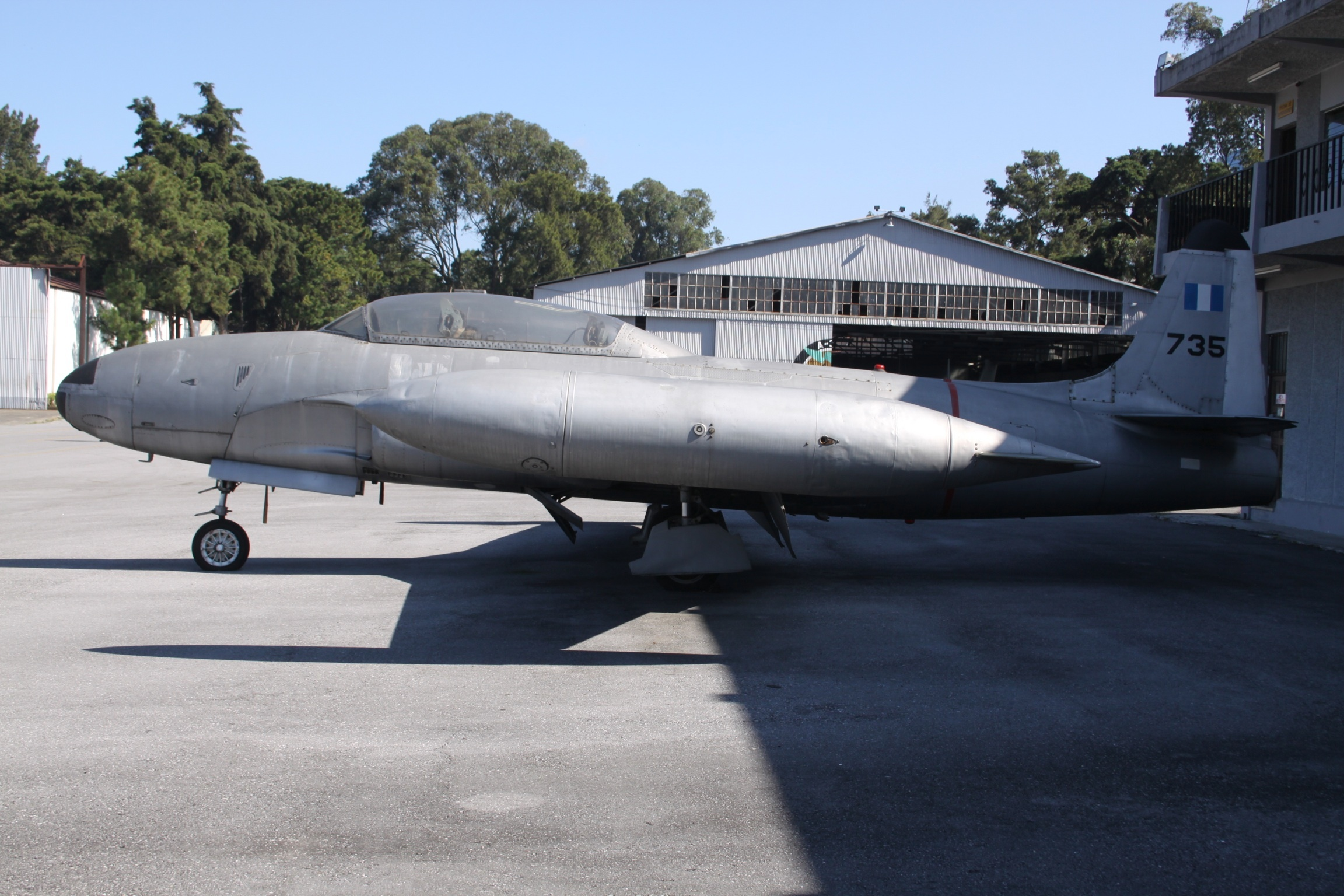
Guatemalan Air Force T-33

In 1920 a French military aviation mission opened a flying training school. The 'Cuerpo de Aviacion Militar de Guatemala' was established in 1929 – with pioneer pilots Jacinto Rodríguez Díaz and Miguel Garcia Granados Solís, among others – and started to expand in 1934. The outbreak of World War II hindered any further expansion until 1942, when Guatemala started to receive lend-lease military assistance. Guatemala signed the Inter-American Treaty of Reciprocal Assistance in 1947 at Rio, Brazil. The air force was renamed the Fuerza Aerea Guatemalteca (FAG) in 1948. In the 1960s, the strike aircraft and basic interceptor used was the F-51 Mustang, supplied from surplus US stocks.

=== Guatemalan Civil War ===
The first jet aircraft to enter service was the Lockheed T-33 trainer to fight the growing insurgency; the US supplied four jets in 1963, two in 1964 and two more in 1965. In 1965, the US also supplied four armed Sikorsky UH-19B helicopters, the first military helicopters in Central America. In 1967 the FAG acquired five Bell UH-1B and UH-1D helicopters from the US to reinforce its helicopter force. In 1971 the FAG received eight Cessna A-37 Dragonfly fighter-bombers, a Vietnam-proven light attack jet. Seven more A-37s were supplied in 1974 and 1975.

At the beginning of the 1970s, there was also tension concerning a dispute with the United Kingdom over the territorial status of neighboring British Honduras (now Belize). In 1970, a T-33 overflew Belize City on a photo-reconnaissance mission. In 1971 the FAG forward-deployed seven P-51 Mustangs to an airstrip at Tikal, near the border. Guatemalan C-47 transport aircraft made parachute drops in daylight near the border area. The British reinforced their garrison, but the diplomatic tension eased, and conflict was averted.

In addition to going after the Maya rebels, the FAG destroyed villages providing support by using bombing and napalm. By 1968 the insurgency was almost neutralized but the cost was an estimated 8,000 civilians killed, so in 1977 the US was pressured to cut off overt military aid due to human rights violations. To circumvent this, Guatemala turned to countries like Argentina, Israel and Switzerland, and the United States continued to supply dual-use aircraft and covertly provided the air force with millions of dollars in overhauls and spare parts for previously purchased aircraft. From Switzerland, twelve Pilatus PC-7 were acquired in 1979–1980 as training aircraft, but they were also used in combat during the counter-insurgency.

By the late 1970s the insurgency had been reborn as a mostly Maya peoples rebellion organized around four Maoist-oriented rebel groups, mostly the Guerrilla Army of the Poor. In early 1982 the various guerrilla forces were inflicting 250 casualties per month on the army, so the military again resorted to destroy villages suspected of providing support to the rebels. By the late 1980s an estimated one million Guatemalans had been displaced within their own country and another 250,000 had fled to Mexico and settled in refugee camps there. In the 1980s Guatemala continued to acquire helicopters and airplanes to support the army. In 1981 Guatemala purchased at least 8 Bell 206B civilian helicopters as well as 3 Aérospatiale Alouettes, which they armed for combat. Four Fokker 27s light transport airplanes were acquired in 1982. Between 1975 and the early 1980s Israel supplied 11Arava IAI-201 twin engine transport aircraft, which are excellent for small runways and were easily modified as gunships with the addition of rocket pods and side-mounted machine guns. In the late 1980s France also supplied 3 Fouga CM.170 Magister jet trainer aircraft, which were also armed and used in combat. Air strikes were launched by A-37 jets and PC-7 armed trainers. One A-37 was lost in combat in 1988 down by ground fire in a close support operation. The government also mobilized the nation's civil air fleet and commandeered several Cessna 182 and Cessna 206 with FN or M-60 machine guns fired from the side doors.

By 1986 the rebellion was considered to be generally under control and the military regime turned over power to a civilian president by the mediation of Costa Rica's President Oscar Arias as well as Honduran and Salvadoran governments. The improvement of the political climate also meant the resumption of overt US military assistance. Although the role of the FAG has been much diminished since the Guatemala Peace Treaty was signed in 1996, they have served the country after natural disasters, most notably after Hurricane Mitch and Hurricane Stan. During those disasters, helicopters were used to rescue stranded people, and cargo planes were used to carry food, water and emergency medical equipment to villages and remote places that had been cut off.

== Structure ==
The Guatemalan Air Force was restructured in 2003, along with the rest of the Guatemalan Army. Now it is composed of three operational commands, along with 2 schools, a Hospital (Hospitalito de la Fuerza Aerea Guatemalteca), a Presidential Transport Squadron (Escuadron Presidencial), and a Headquarters Command (Comandancia de la Fuerza Aerea Guatemalteca). The three operational commands are: Comando Aereo Central (Central Air Command) located in La Aurora in Guatemala City and sharing space with the Comandancia de la Fuerza Aerea Guatemalteca, the Comando Aereo del Sur (Southern Air Command) located in Retalhuleu and the Comando Aereo del Norte (Northern Air Command) located in Mundo Maya. The two schools are the Escuela Militar de Aviacion (Military Aviation School, or EMA) which trains new pilots and standardizes pilots trained in other countries. The school is based in Retalhuleu, but does temporary detachments all over the country for training. The other school is the Escuela Tecnica Militar de Aviacion (Technical Military Aviation School, ETMA) which is a military high school that trains all of the FAG's new mechanics and is located at La Aurora. The Hospital and Presidential Transport Squadron are also located in La Aurora but are not located within the Comando Aereo Central.

Further, the Air Force personnel are separated into four main specialties: Fixed Wing, Rotary Wing, Maintenance, and Air Defence. These four specialties form Squadrons or Units which are represented in every Command and operating location.

Most FAG Aircraft are based at La Aurora, but perform detachments as necessary to other bases as operations require. The exception for this is the EMA aircraft, the Presidential aircraft, and a few aircraft permanently based at the two other Operational Commands.

The Cessna A-37 is the main jet aircraft, while the retired Pilatus PC-7s were used for training. In September 2011, Guatemala requested credit approval of $166 million to buy six EMB-314, radar and equipment. On 3 July 2019, Guatemala ordered two IA-63 Pampa jet trainers from Argentina, but Guatemala cancelled the order 9 days after due to "lack of transparency surrounding the deal."

== Aircraft ==
=== Current inventory ===
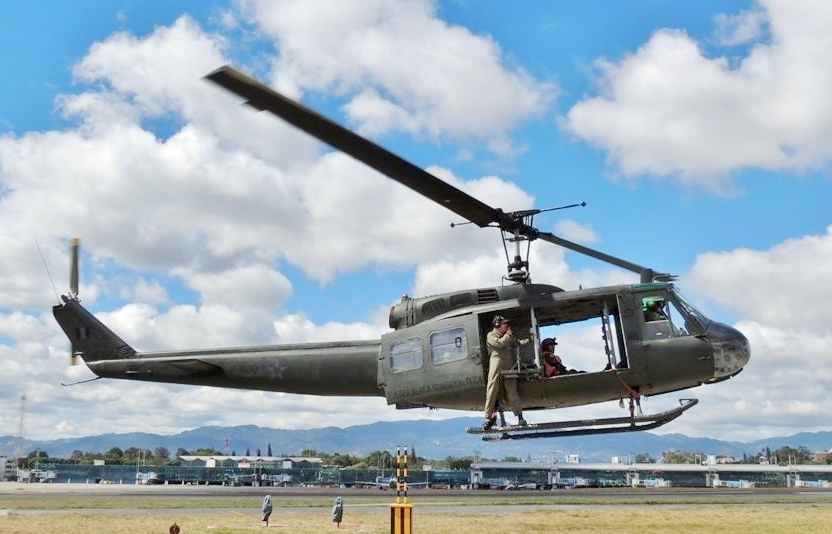
Guatemalan Air Force Bell UH-1H

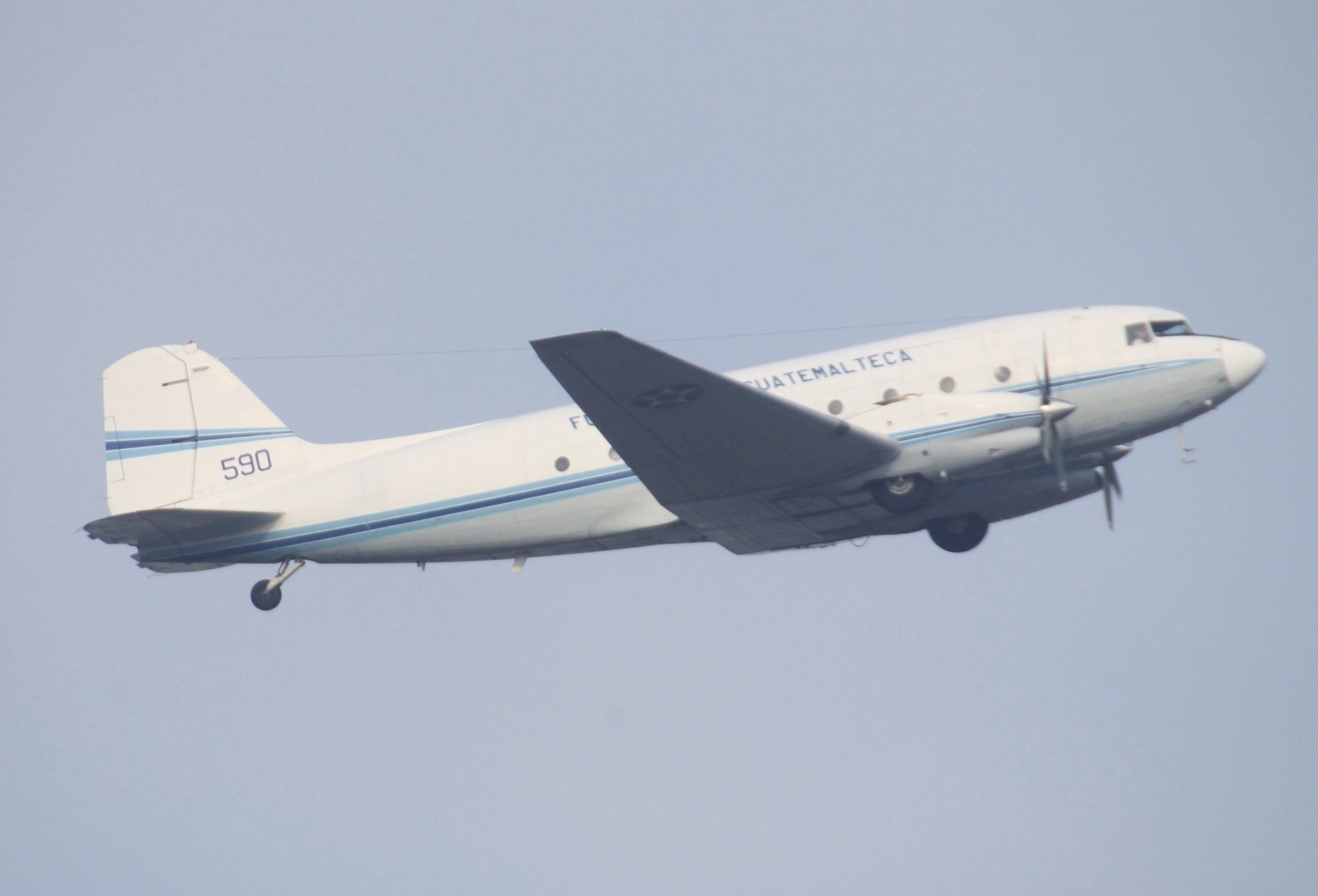
A Guatemalan Air Force Basler BT-67

Aircraft	Origin	Type	Variant	In service	Notes
Combat aircraft
Pilatus PC-7	Switzerland	Light attack		2	
A-37 Dragonfly	United States	COIN / Light attack		3	
Transport
Cessna 208	United States	Transport / Utility		5	
Super King Air	United States	VIP transport	90/200	2	
Pilatus PC-12	United States	Transport / Utility		2	
DHC-6 Twin Otter	Canada	Transport		1	
Dash 8	Canada	Transport		1	
Piper PA-31 Navajo	United States	Transport		1	
Ayres Thrush	United States	Utility	S2R-T660	3	Used for aerial firefighting.
Helicopters
Bell 206	United States	Liaison / Utility		4	
Bell 407	United States	Liaison / Utility		1	
Bell UH-1	United States	Utility	UH-1H	8	One aircraft is an Agusta built AB 205
Bell 212	United States	Utility		2	
Bell 412	United States	VIP		3	
Eurocopter AS350	France	Utility		1	
Bell 429	United States	Utility		1	

=== Retired ===
Previous notable aircraft operated consisted of the North American P-51D Mustang, Douglas B-26, Douglas C-47 Skytrain, Lockheed T-33 Shooting Star, Fouga CM.170 Magister and more recently the S-76 Spirit helicopter

== See also ==
- Guatemalan Civil War
- Jacinto Rodríguez Díaz
- La Aurora International Airport
- Mexico–Guatemala conflict
