= Jaume Sabartés =

Spanish painter

Jaume Sabartés i Gual (Catalan: Jaume Sabartés i Gual, Spanish: Jaime Sabartés y Gual, born in Barcelona, 10 June 1881 - died in Paris, 12 February 1968), was a Catalan Spanish artist, poet and writer. He was a close friend of Pablo Picasso and later became his secretary/administrator.

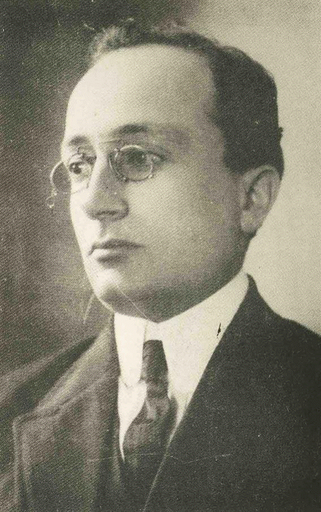
Photo of Jaume Sabartés in 1913.

== Early life ==
Sabartés was born at 84 Sant Pere Més Baix Street in Barcelona (carrer de Sant Pere Més Baix, 84). His father, Francisco Sabartés Obach, was a primary school teacher originally from Oliana. His mother, Maria Gual Oromí, was born in Barcelona. According to Francoise Gilot, Sabartés was a cousin of Joan Miró. In 1901 Sabartés studied fine arts and sculpture under Manuel Fuxà at the Escola de la Llotja and under the pen name of Jacobus Sabartés wrote prose and poetry and collaborated with the Joventut magazine. He was a regular at the Quatre Gats cafe, and he was part of Picasso’s group in Barcelona and Paris.

== Time in Guatemala ==
Sabartés moved to Quezaltenango, Guatemala in 1904 to stay with his maternal uncle Francisco Gual Oromí (1872-1931), who was a businessman. There he published articles in local newspapers such as Diario de los Altos and El Tecolote. On 11 January 1908, Sabartés married Rosa Corzo Robles, who was the daughter of the owners of the house where he resided. The family moved to New York in 1912 but returned to Guatemala in 1913. Their son, Mario de Jesús Sabartés Robles, was born in 1914. They moved to Guatemala City in 1920, where he worked for the Alliance Française and became the first teacher of perspective and of history of art at the National Academy of Fine Arts, while continuing to contribute to different newspapers, such as the Diario de Centro América. During his time in Guatemala, Sabartés organised several major exhibitions of modern art featuring Picasso and other artists, as well as participating in the intellectual life of the capital, taking part in regular intellectual gatherings and discussions and establishing friendships with artists such as Carlos Valenti, Carlos Mérida, Humberto Garavito, Rafael Yela Günther and Rafael Arévalo Martínez, among others. During the celebrations of the centenary of Guatemalan independence Sabartés was on the jury for an art prize which was won by Humberto Garavito.

Pablo Picasso, 1902, Le bock (Portrait de Jaime Sabartés), oil on canvas, 82 x 66 cm

== Return to Spain ==
After some 23 years in Guatemala, Sabartés returned to Barcelona in 1927 with his family to obtain medical treatment for his son. Sabartés separated from his wife in 1928, leaving her his wealth, and eloped with his girlfriend from youth, Mercedes Iglesias. They travelled to Paris to visit Picasso and request financial support to embark for Montevideo, Uruguay, where Sabartés practiced journalism for the newspaper El Dia.

== Association with Picasso ==
According to Paula Cantó, "Picasso and Sabartés were born in the same year, 1881. They met [in 1899] when they were studying at the Llotja art school of Barcelona, and they were both regulars at Els Quatre Gats, where the youngest artistic circle of Barcelona would gather."

Sabartés and Picasso remained close until the former's death. In 1899, Picasso painted his first portrait of Sabartés, which is now in the Pushkin Museum, Moscow. At Picasso's request, Sabartés moved back to Europe from Uruguay, settling at rue La Boétie in Paris in November 1935, and became Picasso's full-time secretary, organising his papers, books and poems, and was responsible for arranging his exhibitions. Sabartés collected a great many works by Picasso which he donated to the Museu Picasso in Barcelona in 1963, forming the original core of this museum (together with works donated by the artist himself), which was initially known as the Sabartés Collection because Francoist Spain would not have approved of a museum by the name of Picasso, an outspoken enemy of the Francoist government. Sabartés' books and papers were donated to the Museo Picasso Málaga.

== Legacy ==
In 2007, Barcelona City Council gave the name of Plaça Sabartés to the new remodelled urban space behind the Picasso Museum, between the streets of Montcada and Flassaders. In 2008, the Museu Picasso opened a new Sabartés Room, which includes a new acquisition: a portrait of Sabartés as a faun, dated 1946.

== Sources ==
- Who was Sabartés? by Carol Sutton, Carolsutton.net, last updated 22 August 2005.
- LUJAN, Luis. “Jaime Sabartés en Guatemala: 1904-1927”. Serviprensa Centroamericana, Guatemala, 30 de julio de 1981, p. 44
- portraits of Sabartes by Picasso
- Biography of Sabartés from the Museu Picasso

This article is translated from the corresponding articles in the Spanish, Catalan and Russian wikipedias.
