= Jacinto Rodríguez Díaz =

Guatemalan pilot

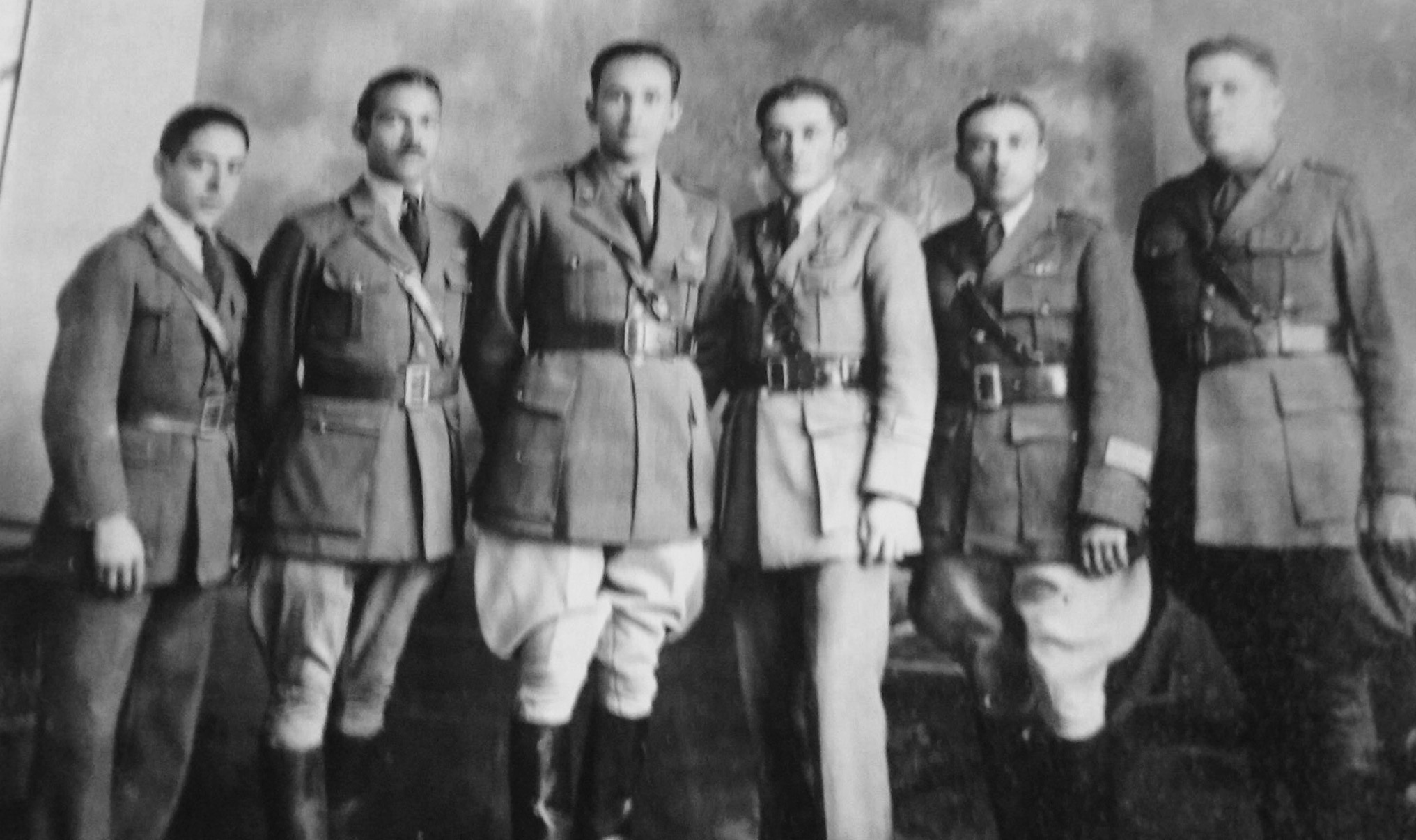
- Aviation pioneers in Guatemala: Infantry Colonels Manuel Samayoa, Ricardo Rodas, Miguel García Granados Solís, Jacinto Rodríguez Diaz, Oscar Morales López and Perfecto Flores.
- Born: 16 August 1901; Totonicapán
- Died: 28 September 1929 (aged 28); Guatemala City
- Education: Escuela Politécnica (Guatemala)
- Military career
- Allegiance: Guatemala
- Branch: Guatemalan Army
- Rank: Colonel
- Nickname: Chinto Rodríguez Díaz
- Units: President Manuel Estrada Cabrera Army Staff; Military Aviation Corps (pioneer)

Jacinto Rodríguez Díaz (Totonicapán, 16 August 1901 – Guatemala City, 28 September 1929) was one of the aviation pioneers in Guatemala.

== Biography ==
Rodríguez Díaz attended the military school, where he graduated as infantry second lieutenant, and then was assigned to the Presidential Army Staff of Manuel Estrada Cabrera. A few years later, travelled to the United States to attend the aviation school in that country. Along with Miguel García Granados Solís, Óscar Morales López and Ricardo "Chato" Rodas were the aviation pioneers in Guatemala when they collected funds to buy the first airplane in the country, which they christened with the name "Central America". (Note: An image of the "Central America" can be found here: Peten culture and more: "Central America" plane piloted by Jacinto Rodríguez Díaz Consultado el 5 de agosto de 2014)

== First airline service in Guatemala ==
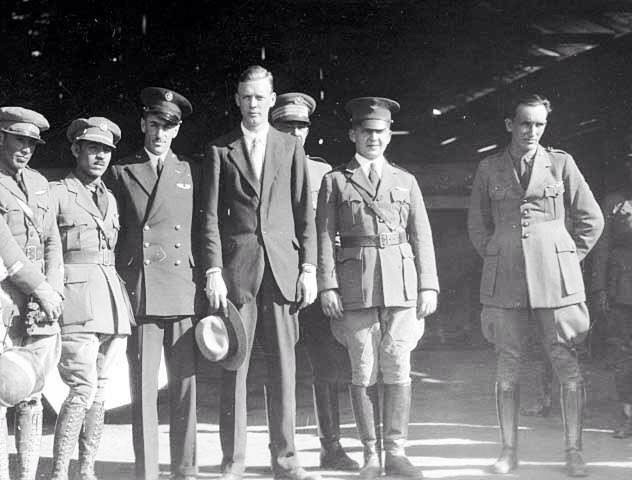
Rodríguez Díaz next to American colonel Charles Lindbergh Guatemalan aviation pioneers Ricardo Rodas and Miguel García Granados Solís.

In 1929, Guatemalan military aviators – led by Colonel Miguel García Granados Solís – had been able to set up a modest airline service in the country using three Ryan Brougham B-5 single engine planes that they used to transport mail and cargo to the farthest posts in Guatemala. Rodríguez Díaz flew to El Petén, a region that due to its remote location, it was much easier to reach El Petén by plane than by land. Rodríguez Díaz landed in Santa Elena on 20 Jul 1929, San Francisco in two occasions and La Libertad also in 1929. The first plane to land La Libertad was piloted by coronel Miguel García-Granados Solís -grandchild of former president Miguel García Granados- in 1926, followed by a visit of the famous American pilot Charles Lindbergh and Rodríguez Díaz was the third to land there in 1929.

But this pioneering service did not last very long: Rodríguez Díaz died in September 1929 in an air crash in Guatemala City, Garcia Granados left Guatemala and a French Aerial Mission arrived to Guatemala to train the military pilots of the Military Aviation Corps in warfare techniques.

== Death ==
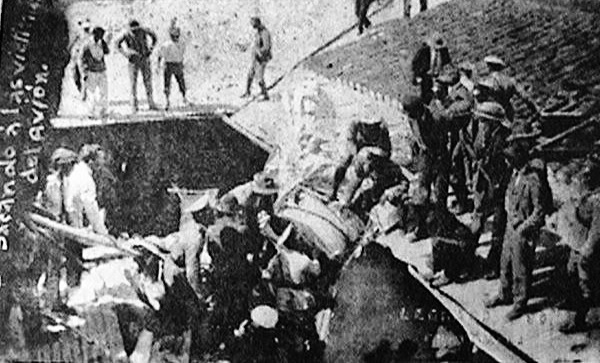
28 September 1929: Rodríguez Díaz died in an air crash.

Colonel Rodríguez Díaz died on 28 September 1929, in a tragic accident known as "Dolores Street air crash"', along with lawyer José Luis Balcárcel (member of the Generation of 1920 intellectuals and classmate of future Literature Nobel Prize awardee Miguel Ángel Asturias, among others), the child Carlos Montano Novella and engineer Julio Montano Novella, Guatemalan Consul in New York City. Only Julio Montano survived.

Rodríguez Díaz's tomb was designed and built by Guatemalan sculptor Rafael Yela Günther and is in the Guatemala City General Cemetery.

== Awards and recognitions ==
For his numerous services to his country, Colonel Rodríguez was awarded 53 medals and 15 trophies by the different army bases of the time: Fort Matamoros, Guard of Honor, Fort San José and the President's Army Staff. Colonel Rodríguez's father donated all his son's awards and trophies to the Guatemalan Military Academy after his death.

== Jacinto Rodríguez Díaz Island ==
The Guatemalan government named a little island in his honor in San Miguel, El Petén. The island is situated in N 16°55'59.99" and W 89°52'59.99" and is a tourist attraction visited by those who come for the Tikal National Park and other interesting sites in that region.

== See also ==
- Charles Lindbergh
- History of Guatemala
- La Aurora International Airport
- Lázaro Chacón
- Military Aviation Corps of Guatemala
