= Rafael Yela Günther =

Guatemalan artist (1888–1942)

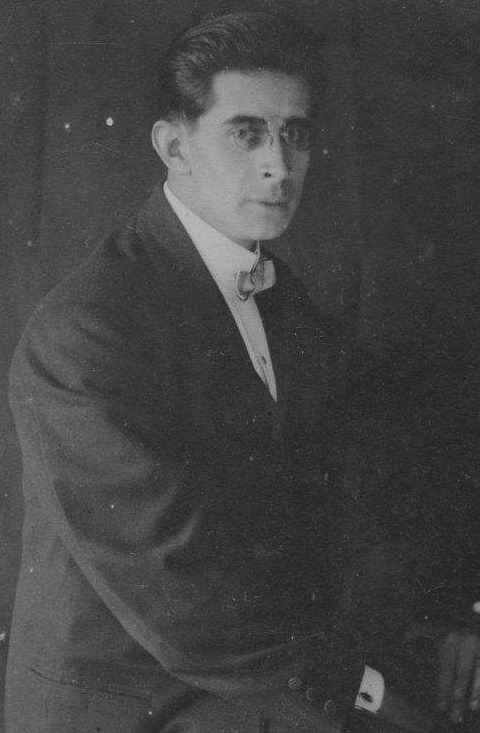
- Rafael Yela Gunther, ca. 1910
- Born: September 18, 1888; Quetzaltenango, Guatemala
- Died: April 17, 1942 (aged 53); Guatemala City, Guatemala
- Known for: painting, sculpture. architecture
- Notable work: José Francisco Barrundia monument, Guatemala City General Cemetery, 1905/1906; Isabel La Católica monument, Guatemala City, 1915; Leaders of the Independence monument, Guatemala City, 1934/1935; Jacinto Rodríguez Díaz mausoleum, Guatemala City General Cemetery, 1932; Justo Rufino Barrios monument, 1941

Rafael Yela Günther (September 18, 1888 – April 17, 1942) was a Guatemalan painter and sculptor.

== Biography ==
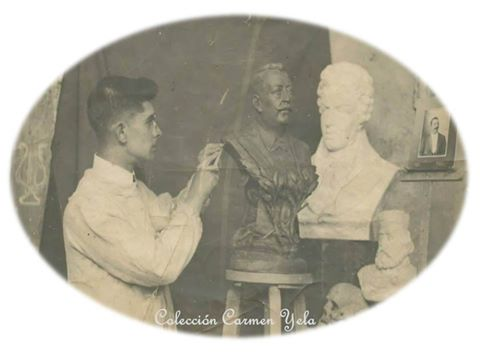
Yela Günther working in his studio. Photograph by Carmen Yela.

Yela studied sculpture under his father Baldomero Yela Montenegro (1859–1909), a sculptor and marble-carver, and afterwards under the Venezuelan Santiago González (1850–1909). The Italian Antonio Doninelli taught him bronze casting techniques. In his early life he made the acquaintances of notable artists like Carlos Mérida, Carlos Mauricio Valenti Perrillat and Jaime Sabartés.

He was a member of the 1910 Generation in Guatemala

Around 1921, after being disappointed of the Unionist Party that overthrew president Manuel Estrada Cabrera, and in which he had been actively involved in Quetzaltenango, he moved to Mexico, where he met Diego Rivera and came in contact for the first time with Maya art and Aztec art through the famous archeologist Manuel Gamio. Over the years of Gambio's large anthropological and archeological project, besides Mexican scholars a group of intellectual from all over the world came to Teotihuacan and help him in several ways; Yela Günther was one of them, working for Gamio from 1921 to 1925.

In Teotihuacan, Yela Gúnther worked in several tasks, working on the large Auditorium project, the museum murals and the sculptor known as "Tríptico de la Raza" ("Race triple sculpture"); regarding the Auditorium, besides building it, he was in charge of its ancient native motif decorations in which it is evident the influence that Diego Rivera had on his work. After completion of the building, Yela continued workin in Mexico for the old Secretariat of Anthropology; about his work, Diego Rivera said that Yela Günther was the best representative of the Mexican sculpture movement at the time.

In 1926, Gamio was forced to leave Mexico due to serious accusations that he had been bribing his superiors; he left for New York City and then, thanks to Yela -who had come along as his private secretary- moved to Guatemala City where he worked on the ruins of Kaminal Juyú. In that mayan city they made several stratigraphic wells that were later used by Alfred Kidder to work on the systematic excavation of the site.

From 1927 to 1930 the lived in the United States, where the worked with Edgar Lee Hewett, who had already worked in Guatemala in the Quiriguá Maya site between 1910 and 1913 and who had been a mentor to other famous archeologist such as Sylvanus Morley and Kidder. In 1930, Yela Günther went back to Mexico as the cultural attaché of the Guatemalan Embassy and in 1935, the government of general Jorge Ubico appointed him as director of the Escuela Nacional de Artes Plásticas "Rafael Rodríguez Padilla" (Plastic Arts Academy «Rafael Rodríguez Padilla») where he worked until his death in 1942.

Regarding his relationship with president Ubico there are diverse opinions; while Ubico was a despotic leader that did not tolerate any opposition but that was in search of all kinds of contemporary culture -such as Mexican Muralism at the time-, and Yela -after having spent a few years with Gamio- was more inclined to the ideals of the Mexican Revolution, art was one of the few means by which a Guatemalan could earn a decent living at the time.

== Selected works ==
- Monument to José Francisco Barrundia, Guatemala City General Cemetery, 1905/1906
- Monument to Isabella I of Castile, Guatemala City, 1915
- "Triptych of the Races", Teotihuacan, Mexico, 1922 (destroyed in the 1960s): about this, Gamio said that Yela Günther drew the three portals images, synthesizing both graphic and symbolically life of Teotihuacan during its three evolution periods.
- "A family on its way to the market", Teotihuacán, Mexico, 1925
- Monumento to the Central America Founding Fathers ("Obelisco de la Independencia", (1934/1935)
- Pioneer pilot Jacinto Rodríguez Díaz tomb, 1932
- Justo Rufino Barrios monument, 1941: large structure of about 15 m tall located in Quetzaltenango Central Park and unveiled by president Jorge Ubico.
- Statue of Tecun Uman, 16th century ruler of the K'iche' Maya people, Quetzaltenango, Guatemala.
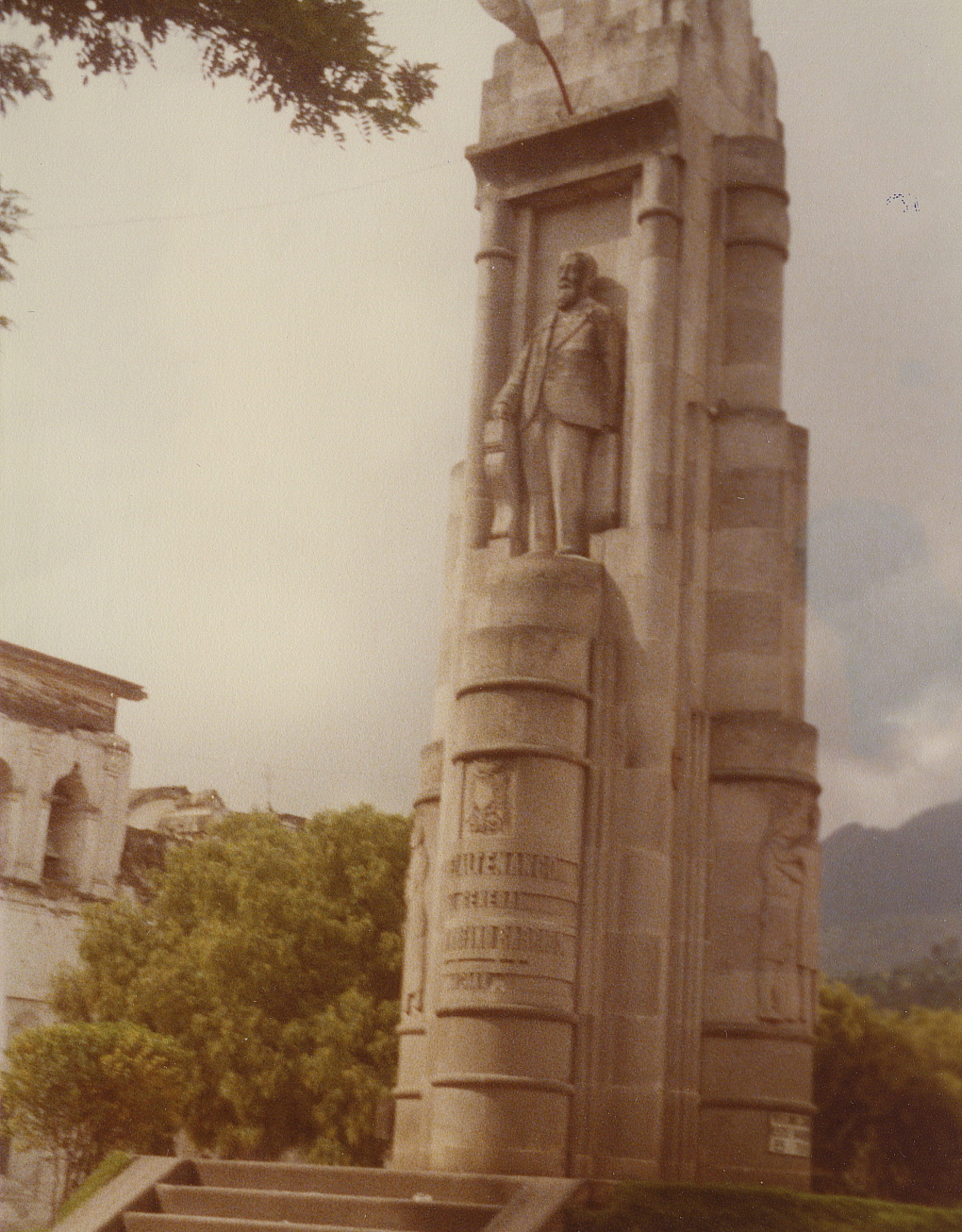
President Justo Rufino Barrios monument in Quetzaltenango.

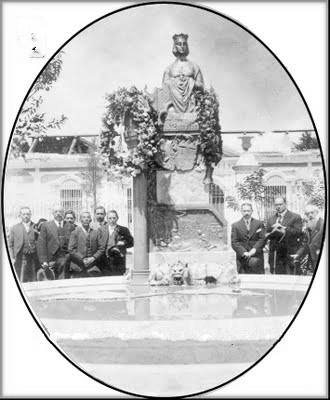
Isabella I of Castile monument, during its opening ceremony in 1915.

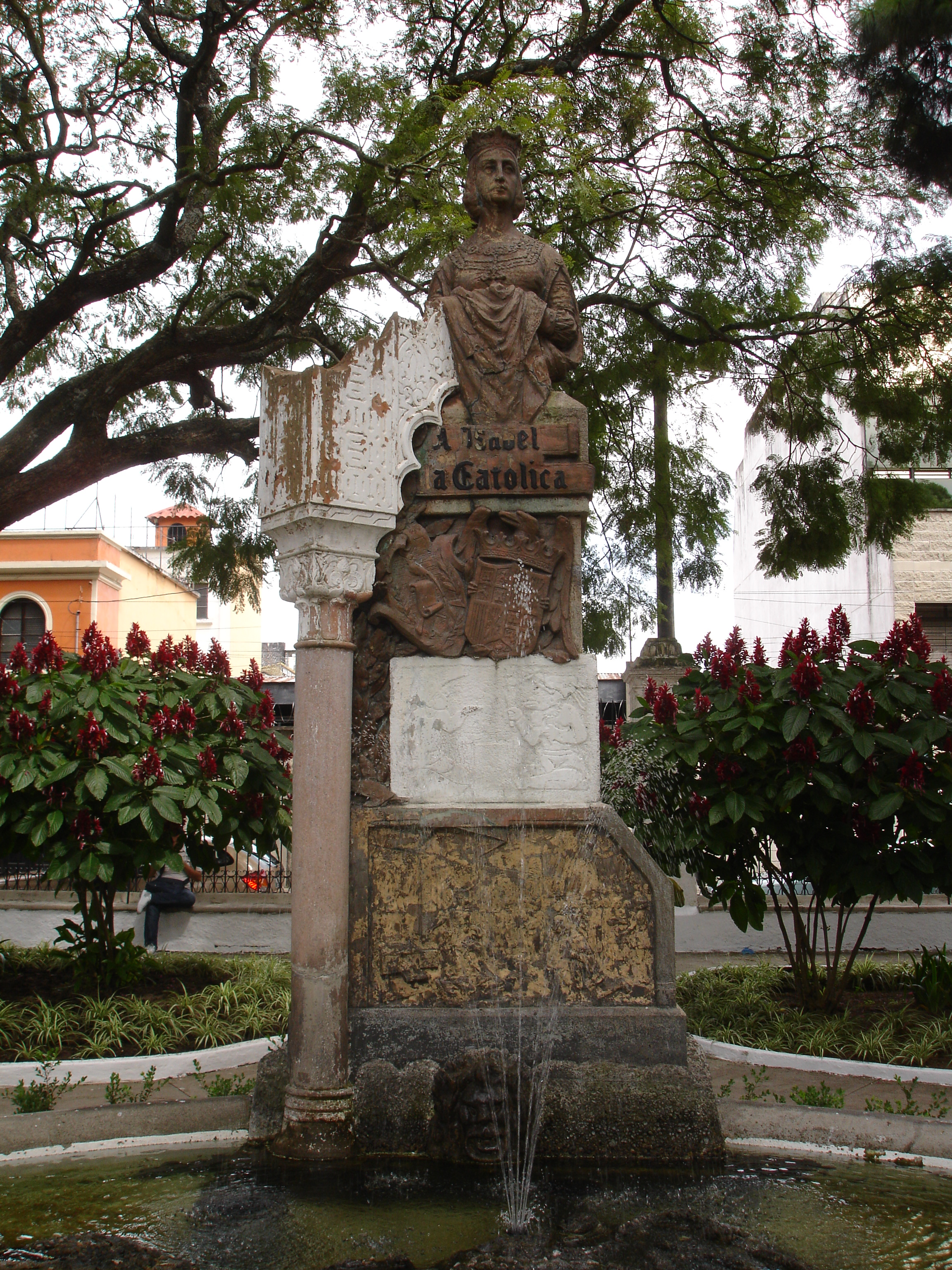
Isabella I of Castille monument in 2005.

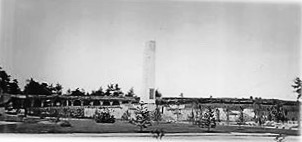
Monument to the Central America Founding Fathers (Obelisco a los Próceres), 1935.

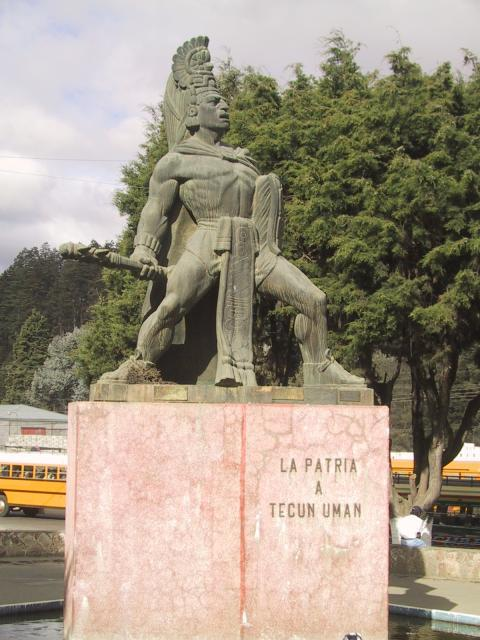
Tecun Uman monument in Quetzaltenango, 2006.

== Notes and references ==
=== Bibliography ===
- Arévalo Martínez, Rafael (1945). ¡Ecce Pericles! (in Spanish). Guatemala: Tipografía Nacional.
- Schálvezon, Daniel (2008). "Rafael Yela Günther y Manuel Gamio en Teotihuacán: una historia desconocida para el arte y la arqueología mexicanos" (PDF). Anales del Instituto de Investigaciones Estéticas (in Spanish). Mexico: Universidad Nacional Autónoma de México.
