= Carlos Wyld Ospina =

Guatemalan novelist, essayist and poet

- Born: June 19, 1891; Antigua Guatemala
- Died: June 19, 1956 (aged 65); Quetzaltenango
- Spouse: Amalia Chévez
- Writing career
- Genres: novels, essays, poetry

Carlos Wyld Ospina (June 19, 1891, Antigua Guatemala – June 19, 1956, Quetzaltenango) was a Guatemalan novelist, essayist and poet.

== Biography ==
Wyld was born as son of Guillermo Wyld Quiñones and his wife Soledad Ospina Chaparro, a niece of the Colombian president Mariano Ospina Rodríguez. His paternal grandfather was English.

Wyld spent periods in Mexico and in Guatemala City, but most of his life he lived in Quetzaltenango. Together with Porfirio Barba Jacob he founded the paper Churubusc in Mexico, and was also director of the Guatemalan paperEl Zaraguat. Like Alberto Velásquez Günther, Carlos Mérida and Rafael Yela Günther, he joined the writers' group Los Líricos. He was a member of the Academia Guatemalteca de la Lengua and of the Sociedad de Geografía e Historia (Society of Geography and History).
