= José Milla y Vidaurre =

Guatemalan writer (1822–1882)

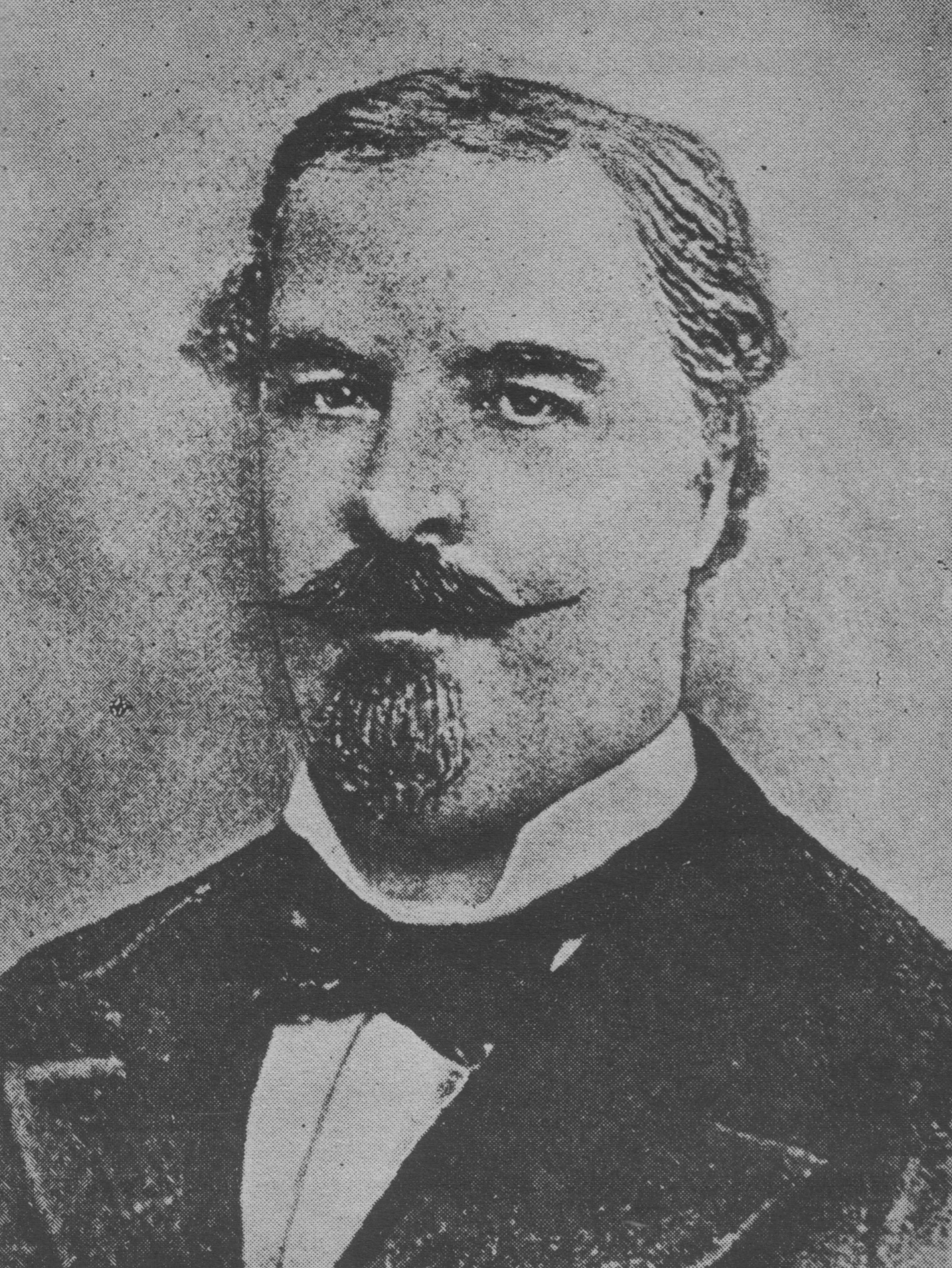
- Born: August 4, 1822; Guatemala City, First Mexican Empire
- Died: September 30, 1882 (aged 60)
- Other name: Pepe Milla
- Spouse: Mercedes Vidaurre Molina
- Children: José, Mercedes, María del Rosario, Marta, Luisa, Pedro and Agustín
- Writing career
- Pen name: Salomé Jil

José Milla y Vidaurre (August 4, 1822 in Guatemala City, First Mexican Empire — Guatemala City, Guatemala September 30, 1882) was a 19th-century Guatemalan writer. He was also known by the name Pepe Milla and the pseudonym Salomé Jil. Son of a governor of the state of Honduras in the Federal Republic of Central America, José Justo de la Milla y Pineda and Mrs. Mercedes Vidaurre Molina, the daughter of a wealthy Guatemalan family. He was married to his cousin, Mercedes Vidaurre and had 7 daughters and sons.

Milla grew up in a time of great instability, where the struggles between liberals and conservatives were bringing chaos to Guatemala. He came from a well-to-do family and was not a politically relevant figure. However, it is known that he had conservative tendencies and came to public office under conservative governments.

His works can be qualified under various literary genres, although they were mainly dedicated to story-telling, novels and more specifically historical novels. His main theme was life in the colonial Guatemala. His "novelas costumbristas" are about the customs of Guatemalan people during colonial times and during the first years after Guatemalan independence.

In his works, he shows an ability for story-telling and imagination. For him, one of the main functions of literature was to entertain and his books are examples of such function. Jose Milla was well-educated, an expert of Guatemalan idiosyncrasies, its history and its customs.

== Works ==
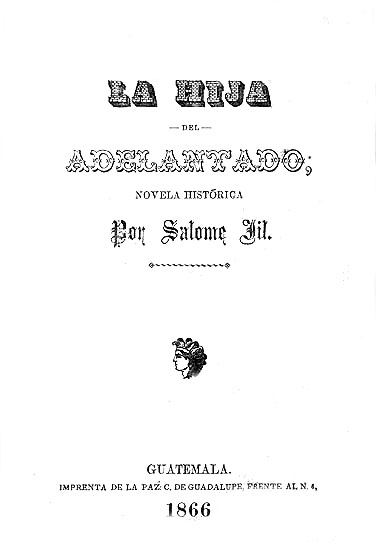
La hija del Adelantado (1866)

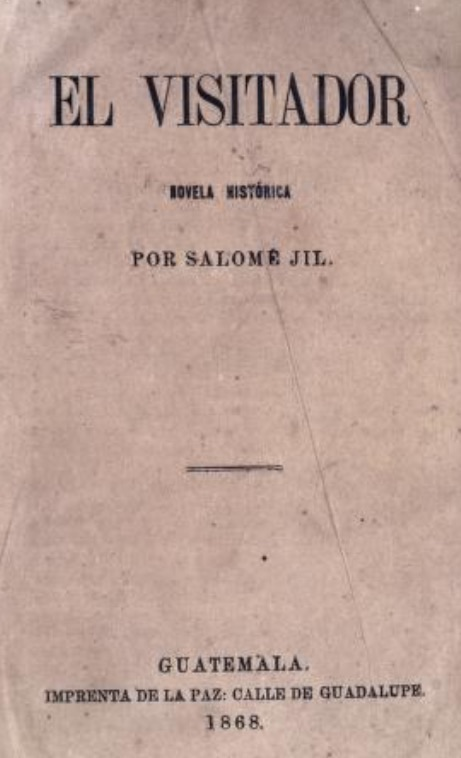
El visitador (1868)

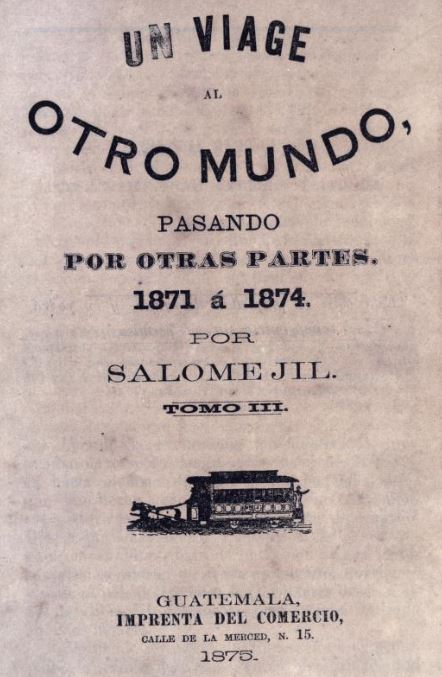
Un viaje al otro mundo pasando por otras partes (1875)
- Don Bonifacio (narrative poem)
- La Hija del Adelantado (novel), 1866
- Los Nazarenos (novel)
- El Visitador (novel)
- Un viaje al otro mundo pasando por otras partes (Volumes 1 & 2)
- Memorias de un abogado (novel)
- El esclavo de don dinero (novel)
- Historia de un Pepe (novel)
- El canasto del sastre (cuadros de costumbres)
- Libro sin nombre
- Historia de la America Central (Volumes 1 & 2)

== Bibliography ==
- Albizúrez Palma, Francisco; Barrios y Barrios, Catalina (1987). Historia de la literatura guatemalteca (3 volúmenes) (in Spanish). Guatemala: Editorial Universitaria.
- Diario de Centro América (2012). "Historia del Diario de Centro América" (PDF). Foro Red Boa (in Spanish). Archived from the original (PDF) on 20 July 2014.
- González Davison, Fernando (2008). La montaña infinita; Carrera, caudillo de Guatemala (in Spanish). Guatemala: Artemis y Edinter. ISBN 978-84-89452-81-7.
- Gullón, Ricardo, ed. (1993). Diccionario de literatura española e hispanoamericana (in Spanish). Madrid: Alianza Editorial. ISBN 84-206-5292-X.
- Hernández de León, Federico (30 April 1959). "El capítulo de las efemérides". Diario la Hora (in Spanish). Guatemala.
- Hernández de León, Federico (30 May 1959). "El capítulo de las efemérides". Diario la Hora (in Spanish). Guatemala.
- Woodward, Ralph Lee Jr. (1993). Rafael Carrera and the Emergence of the Republic of Guatemala, 1821-1871 (Online edition). Athens, Georgia: University of Georgia Press. ISBN 978-0-8203-4360-0.

=== Milla y Vidaurre works ===
- Milla y Vidaurre, José (1865). Cuadros de costumbres guatemaltecas (in Spanish). Guatemala: Imprenta de la Paz.
- Milla y Vidaurre, José (1898). "Historia de un pepe". In Goubaud, E. (ed.). Obras completas de don José Milla (in Spanish) (3^{a} ed.). Guatemala: E.Goubaud y Cía.
- Milla y Vidaurre, José (1868). El visitador (in Spanish). Guatemala: Imprenta de La Paz.
- Milla y Vidaurre, José (1898). "La Hija del Adelantado; Memorias de un Abogado (novela histórica)". In Goubaud, E. (ed.). Obras completas de don José Milla (in Spanish) (3^{a} ed.). Guatemala: E.Goubaud y Cía.
- Milla y Vidaurre, José (1875). Un viaje al otro mundo, pasando por otras partes. 1871 a 1874 (in Spanish). Guatemala: Imprenta del Comercio.
- Milla y Vidaurre, José; Gómez Carrillo, Agustín (1905). Historia de la América Central; desde el descubrimiento del país por los españoles (1502) hasta su independencia de España (1821) (in Spanish). Guatemala: Tipografía Nacional.
