= Magdalena Spínola =

Guatemalan teacher, poet and journalist

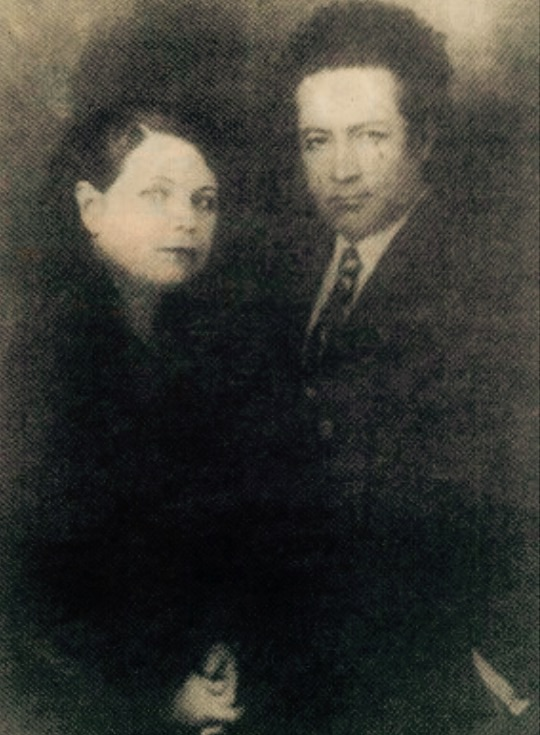
- Magdalena Spinola with her husband Efraín Aguilar Fuentes in 1930
- Born: Magdalena Spínola Strecker; 26 December 1896; Jutiapa, Guatemala
- Died: 7 January 1991 (aged 94); Guatemala City, Guatemala
- Occupations: writer, educator
- Years active: 1938–1977
- Notable work: Gabriela Mistral: huéspeda de honor de su patria

Magdalena Spínola (1896–1991) was a Guatemalan teacher, poet and journalist. Orphaned at a young age, she found encouragement from her childhood neighbor Miguel Ángel Asturias for her literary dreams. After graduating from the country's Teacher's College, she taught school at a private academy and began to publish poems.

Though her husband was part of dictator Jorge Ubico Castañeda's cabinet, they became enemies and Efraín Aguilar Fuentes, her husband, was arrested and shot. She was briefly arrested as well and ostracized by many. She was an ardent feminist and became outspoken about political issues after the fall of Ubico's government.

She was the biographer of Gabriela Mistral and one of the first female erotic poets of Central America.

== Biography ==
Magdalena Spínola Stecker was born on 26 December 1896 in Guatemala to Rafael Spínola Orellana and Florencia Strecker Frías Her mother died when she was four years old and a year later her father died. She and her sister, Stella were then split up as well, with Stella going to live with her maternal grandparents and Magdalena sent to live with her paternal grandparents. Spínola's neighbor was Miguel Ángel Asturias, who became her childhood friend and with whom she discussed an awakening love of literature. Asturias would later dedicate his first book to her.

Spínola began her schooling at the Dolores y Jesús Muños Kindergarten and then attended the Colegio "Central de Señoritas" under the tutelage of Concepción Saravia de Zirión. She was surprised to discover that her textbook prologue had been written by her father. After a time, she changed schools and began attending Colegio de Señoritas San Rosa. Completing her secondary education, Spínola enrolled in teacher's college at the Instituto Normal Central para Señoritas Belén graduating with her teaching credentials. She got a job at a private school Colegio "Josefina González" for the 1914–1915 term.

=== Early writing efforts ===
In 1915, Spínola wrote her first story, entitled Nubia and sent it to Revista Guatemala Informativa, where it was reviewed and accepted by Carlos Wyld Ospina, Virgilio Rodríguez Beteta and Máximo Soto Hall. Buoyed, by her success, she submitted pieces to La República, Revista La Esfera and the prestigious newspaper Quetzaltenango, but soon writing took a back seat as she and Efraín Aguilar Fuentes married and began their family. She quickly had five children, but lost a pair of twins and a baby, leaving her with her daughter, Lilian Eugenia, the oldest, and a son, Rafael, named after her father.

Under the presidency of Manuel Estrada Cabrera, Aguilar's family was persecuted and pushed into exile, first to El Salvador, then Honduras, and finally to Nicaragua. He settled in the city of León, Nicaragua and enrolled in the university there. Spínola, who did not accompany him in exile, revived her literary efforts and other tasks to stay busy. In 1925, inspired by successes in suffrage by women in England, France, and United States Spínola joined with Romelia Alarcón, Laura Bendfeldt, María Albertina Gálvez, Clemencia de Herrarte, Gloria Menéndez Mina, Adriana de Palarea, and Graciela Quan to form the Comité Pro-Ciudadanía to fight for Guatemalan women's suffrage.

Then in 1927, she began writing poetry again beginning with a poem entitled "Amanecida". She published works regularly in the newspapers El Día and Diario de Guatemala and the magazines Eco and Mercurio. Two years later in 1929 she competed in the poetry competition Juegos Florales organized by the Asociación de Periodistas y Escritores de Nicaragua. She won the prize but was stripped of it because they claimed it could not be given to foreign writers. She was disappointed, but entered another contest in December 1929 and won the prize and a monetary award, allowing her to spend Christmas in León with her husband. Her submission was a patriotic piece, Amad a la Patria (Love for the homeland). Three months later, on 27 March 1930, Aguilar graduated with his doctorate in law and returned to Guatemala, joining the cabinet of the newly elected president, Jorge Ubico Castañeda. Spínola had become a collaborator with the newspaper La Noticia and the magazine El Gráfico de Guatemala and life fell into a productive pattern with her writing several hours every day.

=== Treason, murder and redemption ===
The calm didn't last. President Ubico announced that he was running for re-election. Aguilar spoke out against it, as it was against the constitution and the two became enemies. Because of an alleged or actual plot, he and others were arrested and shot, Spínola was imprisoned briefly as well and even after her release was shunned by friends and family. She found solace from writing and returned to teaching, working at the Colegio San Sebastián, founded by Monseñor Mariano Rosell y Arellano in 1936 and 1937.

In 1937, she wrote El preámbulo de la maestra and published several poems in the leading woman's magazine of the era, Nosotras. Spínola participated in a 1938 anthology called Colección lila with Angelina Acuña, Olga Violeta Luna de Marroquín, and María del Pilar de Garcia, which was Central America's first women's poetry collection, both written and published by women. The pieces Spínola included in the volume were laments of love lost, physical longing and have hints that she may have been criticizing the government in the only way possible in the highly censored climate. In 1942, Spínola won a literary prize from the weekly journal Verbum for her "Sonetos del amor eucarístico".

With the student revolts, overturn of the Ubico dictatorship and elections of 1944, Spínola's writing took on a more confrontational tone and she openly began to criticize the government and speak of feminism. Her husband was vindicated and elevated to the status as a hero by the leaders of the 1944 revolution. Increasingly she took on political roles and in 1944 alone, she accepted the presidency of the Association of Intellectual Women of Guatemala; became the secretary for the Guatemalan chapter of the Union of American Women (Unión de Mujeres Americanas); and became a board member for both the Alliance for Citizenship of Guatemalan Women and the Social Democratic Party. She also released a poem "Elegía del que cayó" publicly rebuking Ubico's execution of her husband.

In 1946, the government authorized a printing of 1,500 copies of a poetry collection called "Alondra", but though she needed the money, Spínola did not follow through as she was unsatisfied with the quality of the poems. Throughout the 1940s she remained political, joining several organizations promoting peace, women's rights, and in favor of a Palestinian state.

=== Later career ===
In the early 1950s, Spínola's son Rafael became a diplomat and had several posts throughout South America. Spínola took advantage of the opportunity to travel, visiting Chile in 1954 and Peru between 1955 and 1956. During these travels she published pieces in various newspapers in Guatemala, especially travel commentaries like "Desde Santiago de Chile" and "Desde la Ciudad de los Reyes" which were published in El Imparcial. For many years, she had kept up a correspondence with the writer Carlos Wyld Ospina, which began in the 1940s. They became engaged in the 1950s and planned to marry, but Wyld died in 1956, before they formalized their relationship.

In 1956, Spínola was honored by a group of Honduran poets and she traveled to Tegucigalpa to lecture about Gabriela Mistral for the group "Ideas". In 1958 she received a certificate of merit from her alma mater, Belén and in 1959 a similar acknowledgment from the Association of Guatemalan Journalists. In 1960, she won the first prize at the Day of the Americas celebration with the work Gabriela Mistral o la madre-maestra cantora. The 1960s were a busy time as she lectured, wrote newspaper articles and critiques of Guatemalan literature, and traveled. She performed her poetry as well, sometimes in recitals and regularly read them on the radio. In 1967, Spínola was diagnosed with a uterine tumor which proved to be malignant. She had surgery and traveled to Chile to rest and recuperate. She was able to realize a dream in 1968, when her first book Gabriela Mistral: huésped de honor de su patria was published in Chile, with a preface by her childhood friend Miguel Ángel Asturias.

She returned from Chile in 1971 for a reunion in the United States with her sister, Stella. But that event was marred when she learned that her daughter Lilian was seriously ill. In April, Lilian died from leukemia and those who knew her said it was the first time grief seemed to defeat Spínola who had lost her parents, husband, three other children, her lover and now her daughter. That same year she received the Gold Medal Francisco Méndez for her contributions to national literature, but she was too grief-stricken to stay in Guatemala and fled back to Chile and her son, Rafael.

In 1977, she published her first collection of poems, Tránsito lírico: poemas. In 1981, Horacio Figueroa Marroquín, published a book called Las nueve musas del parnaso guatemalense, in which he named Spínola one of the nine muses of Guatemala. A few months later, she was awarded the Order of Dolores Bedoya de Molina with the degree of Silver Star by President Lucas García. In 1984, Clara Luz Meneses A. de Soto published Spínola's biography.

Her last years were spent in the company of her grandchildren who had formed the rock band Alux Nahual. In 1990, Spínola's son Rafael died and a few months later, her sister Stella died.

Magdalena Spínola Stecker de Aguilar outlived them all, dying on 7 January 1991.

== Selected works ==
=== Books ===
- Spínola, Magdalena; Acuña, Angelina; del Pilar, Marí; Luna, Olga Violeta. Colección lila Guatemala: Talleres Tipográficos Rodríguez (1938) (In Spanish)
- Gabriela Mistral; huéspeda de honor de su patria Guatemala: Tipografia Nacional (1968) (In Spanish)
- Tránsito lírico: poemas Guatemala: Cultura Centroamericana (1977) (In Spanish)

=== Poems and essays ===
- El preámbulo de la maestra (1937)
- Sonetos del amor eucarístico (1941)
- Elegía del que cayó (1944)
- Invocación a Santa Rosa de Lima (1956)
- Gabriela Mistral o la madre-maestra cantora (1960)
- En Vela (1971)

== Bibliography ==
- Aníbal González, Mario (16 September 2004). "Lo que cambió en Octubre de 1944". Albedrio (in Spanish). Guatemala City, Guatemala: Albedrio.
- Figueroa, Bill (31 July 2007). "13356 Don José María Espínola Baeza y Bravo". Genealogía de México. Sociedad Genealógica del Norte de México. Archived from the original on 2 June 2015.
- Finzer, Erin S. (August 2008). "Poetisa Chic: Fashioning the Modern Female Poet in Central America, 1929–1944" (PDF). Dissertations Department of Spanish and Portuguese. University of Kansas.
- Gold, Janet N. (1998). Volver a imaginarlas: retratos de escritoras centroamericanas (in Spanish) (1 ed.). Tegucigalpa: Guaymuras. ISBN 978-99926-15-09-6.
- Mendoza, Rosa (2013). Peripecias de unas aprendices de detectives (in Spanish). Guatemala City, Guatemala: Librerías Artemis Edinter, S.A. ISBN 978-9929-51-003-6.
- Monzón, Ana Silvia (16 October 2012). "Arbenz y la participación política de las mujeres". Revista Albedrio (in Spanish). Guatemala: Paraninfo Universitario: 8–9.
