= Laura Bendfeldt =

Guatemalan women's rights advocate and educator

Laura Zachrisson Descamps
- Born: Laura Zachrisson Descamps; 26 November 1920; Guatemala City, Guatemala
- Died: 10 June 1948 (aged 27); New York City, New York
- Other names: Laura Zachrisson de Bendfeldt; Laura Z. de Bendfeldt
- Occupation(s): educator, suffragette
- Years active: 1925-1948
- Known for: teacher's protest

Laura Zachrisson Descamps (26 November 1920 – 10 June 1948) was a Guatemalan women's rights advocate and educator. She was one of the teachers who was shot during the teacher's protest which occurred on 25 June 1944. She was one of the founders of the women's rights group Comité Pro-Ciudadanía.

== Biography ==
Laura Zachrisson Descamps was born on 26 November 1920 in Guatemala City, Guatemala, to Julia María Descamps Aldana and Carlos Oscar Anselmo Zachrisson Padilla, who was at one point mayor of Guatemala City and finance minister under both president José María Orellana and Lázaro Chacón González. She married Carlos Francisco Federico Bendfeldt Jáuregui and became a teacher.

Zachrisson Descamps was one of a group of teachers who led a protest of the presidency of president Jorge Ubico on 25 June 1944. The 300 women, led by the teachers, gathered in silent protest walking the streets dressed in black with black veils. They were attacked by a cavalry squadron and fired upon with machine guns. Bendfeldt received gunshot wounds, along with Ella Alfaro de Castillo, Esperanza Barrientos, Julieta Castro de Rolz, Dolores Gallardo, Beatriz Irigoyen, Cristina Paniagua, Sally Rau, and Soledad Samayoa. Their colleague, María Chinchilla was killed in the gunfire. Zachrisson Descamps, leading a group of teachers from the Catholic Teacher's Association (Spanish: La Asociación de Maestras Católicas), tried to secure a mass for Chinchilla's funeral at the Cathedral, but was denied by officials who did not want to appear politically involved. The police also denied their request for a mass having no authority to order the church to perform a mass, nor wanting to expose students to more potential violence. Bendfeldt then approached the interim president, writing a letter and going to the presidential palace, but again was denied. The following day, the teachers gathered at the cathedral and formed a funeral procession which wound its way to the cemetery and a prayer was offered up by poet, Angelina Acuña.

Shortly after these events took place, in October 1944, Bendfeldt applied for a scholarship to attend university in New York. In 1945, inspired by successes in suffrage by women in England, France, and United States Zachrisson Descamps joined with Romelia Alarcón, María Albertina Gálvez, Clemencia de Herrarte, Gloria Menéndez Mina, Adriana de Palarea, Graciela Quan and Magdalena Spínola to form the Comité Pro-Ciudadanía to fight for Guatemalan women's suffrage.

She died in New York City on 10 June 1948 and was buried on 12 June 1948 at Fresh Pond Crematory.

== Bibliography ==
- Monzón, Ana Silvia (16 October 2012). "Arbenz y la participación política de las mujeres". Revista Albedrio (in Spanish). Guatemala: Paraninfo Universitario: 8–9.
- Valdez Ochoa, Ileana Patricia (November 2002). Asociaciones Femeninas Durante el Gobierno De Jorge Ubico Castañeda (1931 –1944): Caso de Maria Chichilla (PDF) (Licenciada en Historia) (in Spanish). Guatemala City, Guatemala: Universidad de San Carlos de Guatemala.
