= Gloria Menéndez Mina =

Guatemalan writer and suffragist

- Born: Gloria Menéndez Mina Menéndez; 2 November 1913; Guatemala City, Guatemala
- Died: 28 August 2014 (aged 100); Guatemala City, Guatemala
- Other names: Gloria Menéndez Mina de Padilla (misspelled as Gloria Méndez Mina)
- Occupation(s): writer, women's rights activist, suffragist

Gloria Menéndez Mina (2 November 1913 - 28 August 2014) was a Guatemalan writer and women's rights activist who was involved in the women's suffrage movement in Guatemala. One of the first women to participate in journalism in the country, she directed the magazines Mujer and Azul. In her later career, she served as a press attaché in Mexico and was known for her book, Francisco Javier Mina, héroe de México y España (Francisco Javier Mina, Hero of Mexico and Spain).

== Early life ==
Gloria Menéndez Mina Menéndez was born on 2 November 1913 in Guatemala City, Guatemala to Isaura Menéndez and Tomás Menéndez Mina. She had two brothers, Oscar and Rubén and the children were encouraged in their education. Her father was formerly a colonel in the Guatemalan army and later served in several administrative posts for the government. Her mother was a writer and involved in the women's movement.

== Career ==
Menéndez Mina began her career at the newspaper Nuestro Diario (Our Diary), run by the journalist Federico Hernández de León. She was one of the first women journalists in Guatemala and was affiliate 129 of the Instituto de Previsión Social del Periodista (Journalist's Institute of Social Welfare, IPSP). A prolific journalist, she wrote for various newspapers and served as the director of the journal Mujer (Woman) from 1930 and later the magazine Azul (Blue) from 1950. Menéndez Mina, like other writers and editors-in-chief such as, Malín D'Echevers, journalist and president of the Association of Intellectual Women of Guatemala, Josefina Saravia, editor of Alma América, and Luz Valle, director of the magazine Nosotras, created space in their publications to promote other regional women writers.

In 1944, Menéndez Mina and Graciela Quan met in the offices of Azul and founded the Unión Femenina Guatemalteca Pro-ciudadanía (Union of Guatemalan Women for Citizenship, UFGP) to press for the citizenship and voting rights of women in the country. Quan was elected as president and the women recruited other supporters, like Angelina Acuña de Castañeda, Rosa Castañeda de Mora, Berta Corleto, Elisa Hall de Asturias and Irene de Peyré, among others. The group carried out a national campaign to secure enfranchisement for women from the constituent assembly called in 1945, after the ouster of the dictatorial President Jorge Ubico. Hosting congresses, writing newspaper articles, and petitioning members of the assembly, in February, the women of the UFGP were successful in gaining citizenship rights, including voting, for literate women over the age of 18 in the new constitution.

In 1947, Menéndez Mina was one of the feminists who organized the Primer Congreso Interamericano de Mujeres (First Inter-American Congress of Women), which was hosted by the Unión Democrática de Mujeres in Guatemala City. The purpose of the conference was to generate dialogue among the women throughout the Americas on international affairs so that they could inform policymaking and to promote peace in the region. In 1955, she was one of the 36 nominees for Guatemala's Woman of the Year and in the 1960s, she served as a press attaché in Mexico.

== Death and legacy ==
Menéndez Mina died at home in Guatemala City on 28 August 2014 and was buried at Los Cipreses cemetery.

== Selected works ==
- Menéndez Mina, Gloria (1966). Guatemala (in Spanish). Mexico City: Finisterre, Ecuador Oº O'O" [Revista de Poesia Universal]. OCLC 803899677.
- Menéndez Mina, Gloria (1967). Francisco Javier Mina, héroe de México y de España (in Spanish). Mexico City: Finisterre, Ecuador Oº O'O" [Revista de Poesia Universal]. OCLC 850982448.
