= Romelia Alarcón Folgar =

Guatemalan poet, journalist and suffragette

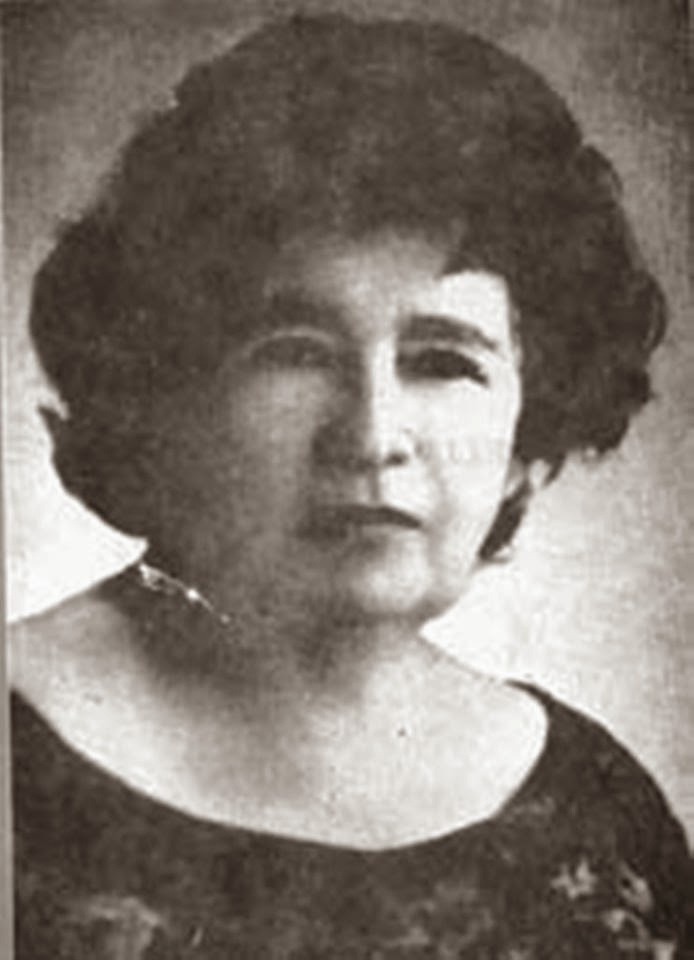
- Born: Romelia Alarcón Barrios; 27 October 1900; Cobán, Alta Verapaz Department, Guatemala
- Died: 19 July 1971 (aged 70); Guatemala City, Guatemala
- Other names: Romelia Alarcón de Folgar
- Occupations: journalist, writer
- Years active: 1938-1971

Romelia Alarcón Folgar (1900–1971) was a Guatemalan poet, journalist and suffragette. Many of her themes had to do with the environment and women's rights. She is considered one of the most notable poets from Guatemala in the 20th century.

== Biography ==
Romelia Alarcón Barrios was born on 27 October 1900 in Cobán, Alta Verapaz Department, Guatemala to María Barrios Noriega and Salvador Alarcón. She married Domingo Folgar Garrido and had seven children. She did not begin writing until after raising her family and all of her works bear her married surname. Through her ties with intellectuals and artists, despite a lack of formal training, she was able to create a career in journalism and as a poet becoming "one of the most important Guatemalan poets of the 20th century". In 1945, inspired by successes in suffrage by women in England, France, and United States Alarcón joined with Laura Bendfeldt, María Albertina Gálvez, Clemencia de Herrarte, Gloria Menéndez Mina, Adriana de Palarea, Graciela Quan and Magdalena Spínola to form the Comité Pro-Ciudadanía to fight for Guatemalan women's suffrage.

Alarcón Folgar worked as a journalist for radio and sometimes for newspapers, also publishing pieces in magazines. She founded the Revista Minuto and as the editor of the Revista Pan-Americana, traveled internationally. She published thirteen books during her lifetime and after her death, one of her daughters published two more books. She began publishing poems in 1938 with the book entitled Llamaradas (Blaze). In it, she speaks as an early environmentalist and the obligation to preserve nature as a means of protecting the mestizo population. Unlike later poems, known for their social commentary, the collection in Llamarades are united by the central theme of protecting the great Maya tree. Some of her early works focus on domestic topics that were not within the confines of what was expected in poetry of the day. Others discussed the struggle to create. Later works denounced women's place in society and lack of freedom and her final works lamented her invisibility and discomfort that the world around her did not comprehend her, only the things that represent her.

Alarcón Folgar died on 19 July 1971 and was buried in the General Cemetery in Guatemala City.

== Works ==
=== Poems ===
- 1938 Plaquetes
- 1938 Llamaradas
- 1944 Cauce
- 1944 Clima verde en dimensión de angustia
- 1954 Isla de novilunios
- 1957 Viento de colores
- 1958 Día vegetal
- 1959 Vigilia blanca
- 1961 Claridad
- 1963 Poemas de la vida simple
- 1964 Sin brújula
- 1964 Plataforma de cristal
- 1966 Pasos sobre la yerba
- 1967 Casa de pájaros
- 1970 Tránsito terrestre
- 1972 Tiempo inmóvil
- 1976 Más allá de la voz
- 1976 El Vendedor de trinos

=== Short stories ===
- 1950 Cuentos de la Abuelita
- 1964 Sin brújula: cuentos
- 1968 Gusano de luz: cuentos infantiles
- 1968 Vendedor de trinos: cuentos de misterio

== Bibliography ==
- André, María Claudia; Bueno, Eva Paulino (2014). Latin American Women Writers: An Encyclopedia. New York, New York: Routledge. ISBN 978-1-317-72634-0.
- Finzer, Erin (2014). "Grafting the Maya World Tree:Cosmic Conservation in Romelia Alarcón de Folgar's Llamaradas (Guatemala, 1938)". Interdisciplinary Studies in Literature and Environment. 22 (2). Association for the Study of Literature and Environment, Oxford University Press: 326–348. doi:10.1093/isle/isu129.
- Monzón, Ana Silvia (16 October 2012). "Arbenz y la participación política de las mujeres". Revista Albedrio (in Spanish). Guatemala: Paraninfo Universitario: 8–9.
