= Elisa Hall de Asturias =

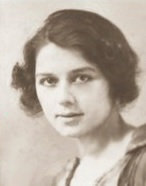
- Born: María Laura Elisa Hall Sánchez; 26 February 1900; Guatemala City, Guatemala
- Died: 20 May 1982 (aged 82); Guatemala City, Guatemala
- Occupation: writer
- Years active: 1937–1939
- Notable work: Semilla de mostaza

Elisa Hall de Asturias (26 February 1900 – 20 May 1982) was a Guatemalan writer and intellectual. In the 1930s, she wrote a book Semilla de mostaza that became the source of controversy for nearly 70 years. Anti-feminist biases at the time that she wrote led to the conclusion that she could not have written the book, which had become a mainstay of Guatemala's literary heritage. In 2011 and 2012, new research into the controversy verified that she was the author of the work.

== Biography ==
María Laura Elisa Hall Sánchez was born on 26 February 1900 in Guatemala City, Guatemala to poet, translator and academic, Guillermo Francisco Hall Avilés and Elisa Sánchez. She was the only daughter in a family of five brothers and grew up in an environment of intellectuals dedicated to education and literature. She began to write at the age of twelve, encouraged by her brother Guillermo Roberto Hall, who was a poet.

From an early age, Hall had a wide correspondence with writers and her scrapbook shows that between 1911 and 1917 she saved letters from Salvadoran poet Juan J. Cañas, Alberto Masferrer, Fences Redish (pseudonym of Dr. Manuel Valladares Rubio), Salomón de la Selva, Baronesa de Wilson, José Ramón Uriarte, and others. This cultural environment surrounded Hall, as her father was a founding member of the Guatemalan Academy of Language, a professor, and a poet; her grandfather, Edward Hall, was a British poet and pianist; her cousins Francisco Fernández Hall and Máximo Soto Hall were writers and poets; and her niece Francisca Fernández Hall Zúñiga was the first female graduate in all of Central America to complete her Civil Engineering degree. Fernández Hall earned her distinction at the Universidad de San Carlos de Guatemala.

During the presidency of Manuel Estrada Cabrera, the family was forced into exile, going to Honduras and El Salvador. Hall's father had been born in Comayagua, Honduras. The family arrived in San Salvador in August 1913, and was there when the catastrophic earthquake of 1917 occurred. The earthquake caused her family to return to Guatemala, but in December of that year, Guatemala City suffered an earthquake with aftershocks that continued into early 1918 that destroyed the city. Hall's desire was to go to medical school, but she was not allowed admittance, as a female.

At the end of the second decade of the twentieth century, Hall met her future husband, José Luis Asturias Tejada, son of Antonio Acisclo Asturias and Elisa Tejada de Asturias. The young couple were married on 3 February 1923 and the following years were spent by Hall with the Asturias family studying and reading literary works. Her father-in-law had an extensive library and was the family genealogist. He kept meticulous records documenting the arrival of the first ancestor, Sancho Álvarez de Asturias, to Guatemala in the second half of the seventeenth century. Reading these documents, inspired Hall to write a memoir, in the form of a historical novel, based on the life of Álvarez de Asturias.

According to her family, Hall was ahead of her time. She was the first female to obtain a driver's license in Guatemala and held the tenth license ever issued. She is also believed to have been the first female pilot.

== Literary works ==
=== Madre maya ===
In the mid-1920s, Hall wrote an unpublished novel called Madre maya (Mother Maya). During the controversy over Semilla de Mostaza, Napoleón Viera Altamirano, director of the newspaper Diario de Hoy de San Salvador stated that he had known since 1928 of Hall's writing Madre Maya from discussions about it with Alberto Masferrer. The book analyzed effects of alcoholism on society and how social norms and views of alcohol created discriminatory practices in Guatemala.

=== Semilla de Mostaza ===
Hall documented in her diary that she began work on Semilla de Mostaza "5 February 1937 and ended on 3 February 1938, at 3:36 in the afternoon". Because during the dictatorship of Jorge Ubico Castañeda very little publishing could be done without government sanction, Hall's father presented the first chapters of his daughter's book to the Guatemalan Language Academy in May 1937, hoping to gain support for publication. The president endorsed publishing the novel and Hall's father and brother Guillermo helped set the typescript.

The first edition run of 1150 copies of Semilla de Mostaza was printed in October 1938 at the National Printing Company and was adorned with pictures by the author. Hall's book immediately caused widespread bewilderment among its readers. Many thought that it was a masterpiece comparable to the works of Lope de Vega, Luis de Góngora and Miguel de Cervantes, and would enrich both Guatemalan letters and world literature. The journalist Federico Hernández de León gave it favorable reviews in the Diario de Centro America on 12 October 1938. But other critics doubted that the book could have been written by a woman, or anyone with no formal educational training.

There were many hypotheses about the authorship of the book. Among them that Hall de Asturias had transcribed an ancient manuscript; that Miguel Ángel Asturias authored the work; that Miguel Ángel Asturias served as a "ghost writer"; or that Hall did write the book. The debate raged in the Guatemalan press for over 2 years, with articles appearing nearly daily in the most important newspapers of the time, El Imparcial, Nuestro Diario and El Liberal Progresista. There were few who were members of Guatemala's academic and intellectual community who were not part of the debate and it extended to El Salvador, Argentina, and even Spain. Much of the argument centered around the fact that Hall was a woman, and at the height of the controversy the book disappeared into the background as intellectuals postured, showing off their skill with language and history.

=== Mostaza ===
After having tried to discuss and meet with opponents, Hall decided her best defense was to produce the second volume of the life of Sancho Álvarez de Asturias. Mostaza (Mustard) was published in October 1939 carrying on with the story and hoping to end the attacks on her literary abilities. With the emergence of Mostaza, those who attacked her changed tactics not refuting that she produced the work, but instead saying the second book was inferior.

In 1977, Orlando Falla Lacayo revived the debate when he published a book Algunas observaciones sobre la novela Semilla de mostaza de Elisa Hall with his conclusions that Elisa Hall de Asturias could not have written the books, given the high degree of knowledge of ancient Spanish that one would need to have had to do so. In 2011, the Spanish philologist Gabriela Quirante Amores, after three years of living in Guatemala and a year of study of the Mostaza series and the first novel of Hall, concluded that Hall did write the books. She criticized the sexism of the thirties era in Guatemala, which denied women the right to create and have recognition for their abilities. In 2012, Quirante's Master's thesis Semilla de mostaza (1938): polémica sobre la autoría y análisis interpretativo de la obra (2012) was presented to a literary tribunal Estudios de Literatura Española e Hispanoamericana of the Universidad de Alicante which recognized the proof of authorship.

== Aftermath ==
Though originally Hall had planned a third installment of the series, she grew a tired of the attacks of the small group of detractors, lost interest in writing and devoted herself to oil painting, watercolor and her gardening.

In 1944, Hall de Asturias joined with a group of women including Angelina Acuña de Castañeda, Berta Corleto, Gloria Méndez Mina de Padilla, Rosa de Mora, Irene de Peyré, and Graciela Quan to form the Unión Femenina Guatemalteca Pro-ciudadanía (Union of Guatemalan Women for Citizenship) favoring recognition of their civil rights, including suffrage for literate women. After the Guatemalan 1944 coup d'état the new Constitution, promulgated on 1 March 1945 granted the right to vote to all literate citizens, including women. In 1947, she helped organize the Primer Congreso Interamericano de Mujeres (First Inter-American Congress of Women) held on 27 August 1947 in Guatemala City, which had as one of its main themes equality of men and women.

She was 60 when she began studying French and spent her time reading books, studying encyclopedias and magazines. She also wrote some free verse poetry. The justification of her authorship of Semilla de Mostaza became an obsession for Hall and in 1981, she made a compilation of the sources that she had consulted to document her work.

Hall died in Guatemala City on 20 May 1982 surrounded by her family.
