= Paulo Alvarado =

Paulo Renato Alvarado
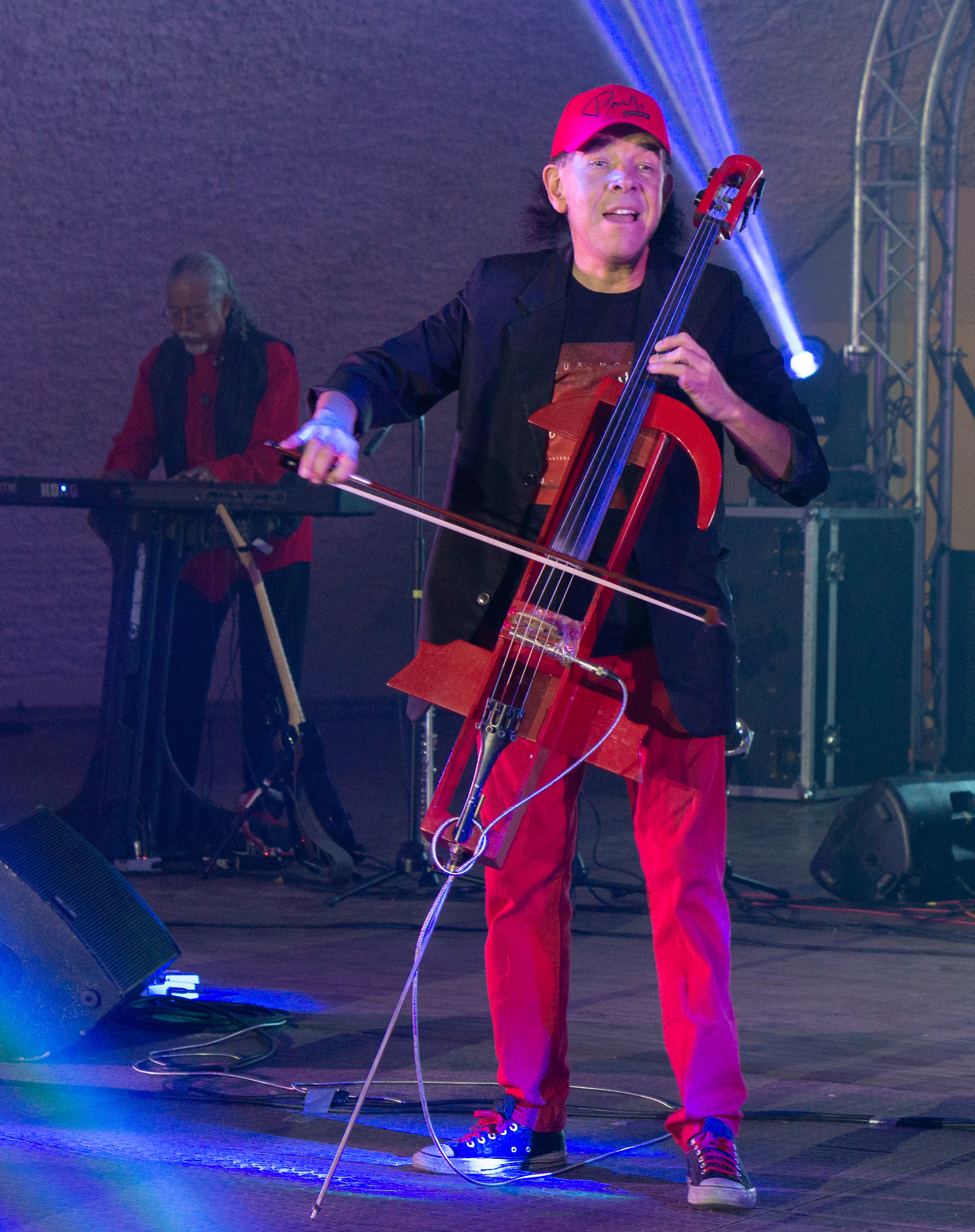

Background information
- Born: 1960 (age 64–65); Guatemala City
- Genres: Rock en español; classical
- Occupation(s): Musician, songwriter, producer.
- Instrument: Cello
- Years active: 1969–present
- Labels: DIDECA
- Member of: Cuarteto contemporáneo de Guatemala

Paulo Alvarado (born 1960) is a Guatemalan cellist, composer and producer born in Guatemala. He studied architecture at Universidad Rafael Landívar but dropped out in 1983 to become a full-time member of the groundbreaking Guatemalan rock band Alux Nahual. Besides his role in that band, continuing to date, he is notable for exploring the use of the cello in a variety of contexts and is active in classical music. In 1992 he founded Cuarteto contemporáneo de Guatemala, a string quartet specializing in a repertoire by Guatemalan composers, either written specifically for a string quartet or adapted for it. He has also been involved in the performance and production of Guatemalan music from the colonial period.

Alvarado is the son of Manuel Antonio Alvarado a Guatemalan educator, and brother of Manuel Alvarado, a British-Guatemalan academic in media studies. He writes a weekly column, Presto non troppo in Prensa Libre, a Guatemalan daily newspaper.

In 2016 he performed and produced El Chelo Guatemalteco, a collection of Guatemalan music rendered for the Cello, with Costa Rican pianist Gerardo Meza Sandoval.

== Discography ==
- La Cantoría de Tomás Pascual (1994). El repertorio de San Miguel Acatán, "Música Guatemalteca, Siglos XVI y XVII", CD, Pajarito Discos 50294-1. (Producer, cello)
- La Cantoría de Tomás Pascual (2000). El Repertorio de San Sebastián Lemoa, CD, Pajarito Discos. (Producer, cello)
- El Actor Etéreo. La música de la Nueva Escena Guatemalteca (2000). Guatemala. CD, Pajarito Discos. (Composer, producer, cello)
- Cuarteto Contemporáneo, "Música Guatemalteca, 1582 - 1990", 1998. CD, (Producer, cello)
