= Cuarteto contemporáneo de Guatemala =

String quartet

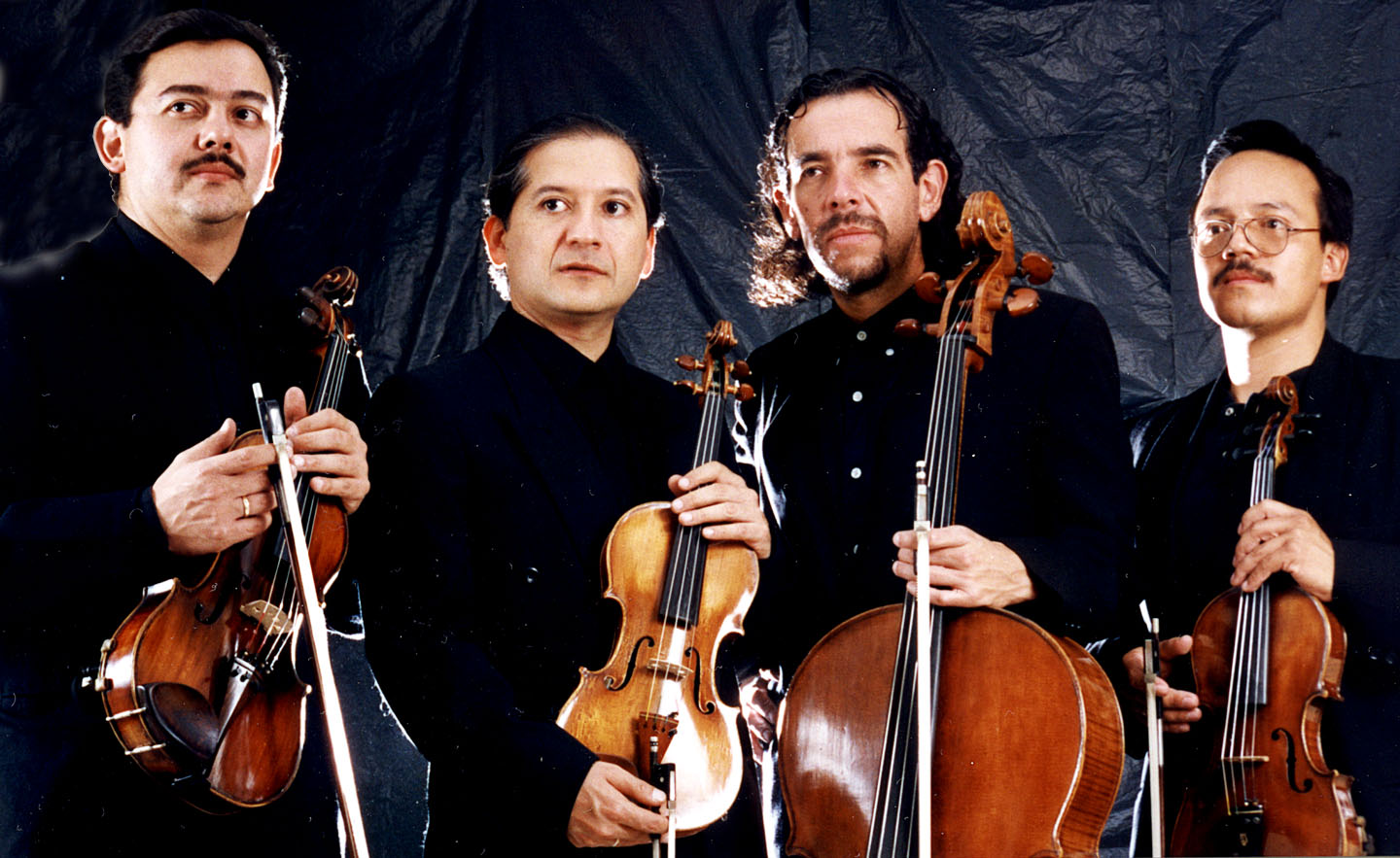
Otto, Marco, Paulo and Alex

Cuarteto Contemporáneo de Guatemala (CCG) was founded in january 1992 by musicians Paulo Alvarado (cello), Marco Antonio Barrios (1st violin), Otto Eduardo Santizo (viola), and Jorge Alfredo Santizo (2nd violin). Membership of the quartet has also included Jorge Mario Alvarado (2nd violin), Linda Leanza (1st violin), and Eduardo Rosales (cello).

== Members ==
For the last decade the quartet has included:

- Marco Antonio Barrios (1st violin),
- Alex Aurelio Salazar (2nd violin),
- Otto Eduardo Santizo (viola), and
- Paulo Alvarado (cello).

All the quartet's members have also been involved in other musical ensembles, such as the Guatemalan National Symphony Orchestra, the Guatemalan Youth Symphony, the Guatemalan Classical Orchestra, Ars Magna string orchestra, and the rock band Alux Nahual.

CCG has appeared on stage with other ensembles, including La Cantoría de Tomás Pascual, the Ars Nova vocal ensemble, Alux Nahual, Richard Clayderman, and singer-songwriters Rony Hernández and Ranferí Aguilar, among others. The quartet has recorded works with artists such as Nelson Leal, Juan Carlos Ureña and Costa Rican band Oveja Negra.

== Discography ==
1. El Repertorio de San Miguel Acatán: Guatemalan Music from the 16th and 17th Centuries, 1994, with La Cantoría de Tomás Pascual.
2. "Cuarteto Contemporáneo, música guatemalteca 1582–1990" (Cuarteto Contemporáneo: Guatemalan Music, 1582 – 1990). 1998.
3. Music for the short film Q'ak Aslemal, directed by Alejo Crisóstomo, 2006.

== Videos ==
- Soundtrack for short film “Qak' Aslemal” – https://www.youtube.com/watch?v=k0M6hS0M7rk
- “Es como un duende” (Like a Goblin) by Oscar Conde – https://www.youtube.com/watch?v=4CRJuGjW00U
- "25 años entre cuerdas" (Twenty-five Years Among Strings), television appearance on El show con Tuti – https://www.youtube.com/watch?v=Eh-u40WLbF0
