= Irene de Peyré =

Guatemalan educator and feminist

Irene de Peyré or Irene Oliveros de Peyré (October 20, 1873 in Santa Rosa Department, Guatemala – June 28, 1968 in Guatemala City, Guatemala) was a Guatemalan educator and feminist. She attended the teacher's training school, Instituto Normal Central para Señoritas Belén In 1920, she established La Alianza Francesa de Guatemala to preserve the culture of French Guatemalans and in 1921, in order promote learning she established the Liceo Francés.

In 1930, she was Guatemala's delegate to the Inter-American Commission of Women, which at that time was involved in the preparation of a massive volume evaluating the effects of marriage on women's citizenship. In 1944, she joined with a group of women including Angelina Acuña de Castañeda, Berta Corleto, Elisa Hall de Asturias, Gloria Méndez Mina de Padilla, Rosa de Mora, and Graciela Quan to form the Unión Femenina Guatemalteca Pro-ciudadanía (Union of Guatemalan Women for Citizenship) favoring recognition of their civil rights, including suffrage for literate women. After the Guatemalan 1944 coup d'état the new Constitution, promulgated on 1 March 1945 granted the right to vote to all literate citizens, including women.

In 1951, when the Jesuits were unable to begin a school due to the government's anti-parochial school policy, Oliveros de Peyré, brought them under the umbrella of the French school for their mutual benefit—the Jesuits were able to secure a school and Oliveros de Peyré was able to secure a boys' section. The school opened in 1952 as Liceo Francés Sección de Varones and by the mid-1950s had changed its name to Liceo Javier.

== Awards ==
In 1958, she was awarded the Order of the Quetzal for her service to the country.
