= Francisca Fernández-Hall =

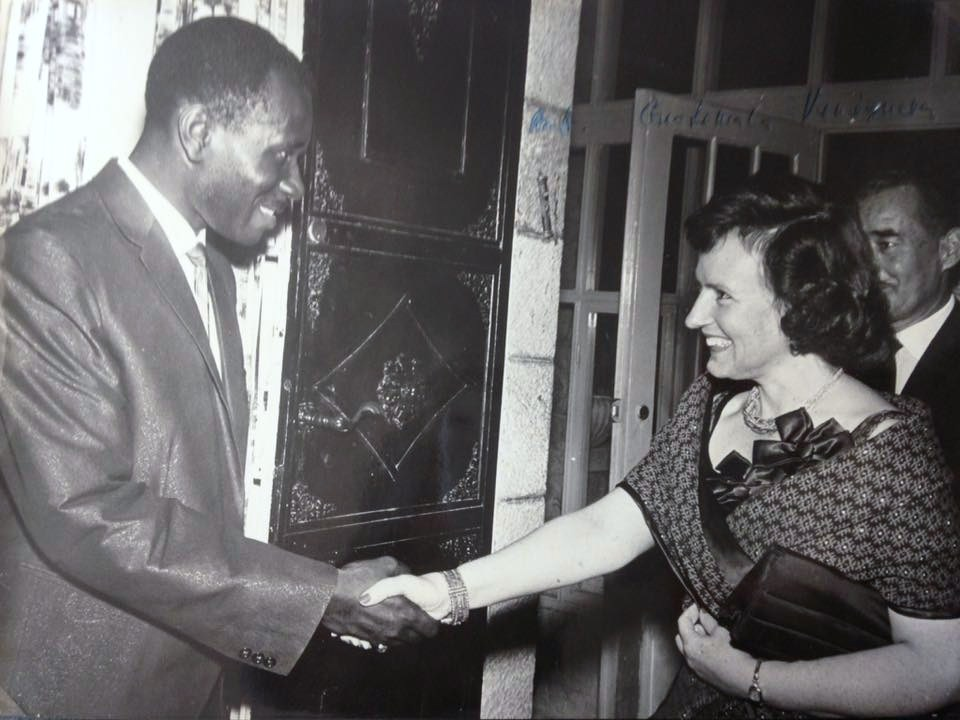
- Born: Francisca Fernández-Hall Zúñiga; April 12, 1921; Guatemala City, Guatemala
- Died: November 27, 2001 (aged 80); Guatemala City, Guatemala
- Occupations: engineer, diplomat
- Years active: 1947–1981

Francisca Fernández-Hall Zúñiga (12 April 1916 – 27 November 2001) was a Guatemalan engineer and diplomat. She was the first woman to graduate from the Universidad de San Carlos de Guatemala, the first woman in all of Central America to earn an engineering degree, the first woman to be accepted and to attend the Instituto Militar de Engenharia of Brazil, and the first female ambassador for Guatemala.

== Early life ==
Francisca Fernández-Hall Zúñiga was born on 12 April 1921 in Guatemala City, Guatemala, to the writer Francisco Fernández-Hall and Concepción Zúñiga Becker. She was one of five siblings, including Alicia, Haroldo, María Teresa Fernández-Hall de Arévalo, and Francisco Fernández-Hall, who was a journalist, teacher at the Colegio de San José de los Infantes, and served as Director of the Museum of History and Fine Arts. Their mother died in 1926 and the children were raised by their father, who never remarried.

== Education ==
She earned a Bachelor of Science and Letters and a Master of Education before applying to the engineering faculty at the Universidad de San Carlos de Guatemala, where she was rejected. Initially, she wanted to study law, but could not meet the entrance requirements. She enrolled in the mathematics department and, after scoring a perfect score on an exam three months later, was admitted to the engineering program. She had the highest grade point average and graduated with her Civil Engineering degree in 1947, the first woman in all of Central America to earn a mathematics degree and graduate as an engineer from the Universidad de San Carlos de Guatemala. She won a scholarship to study engineering at the Instituto Militar de Engenharia (Military Engineering Institute) in Rio de Janeiro, Brazil, the first woman ever accepted or to attend, graduating in 1950 with a Construction Engineering degree.

== Career ==
While she was working on her engineering degree, Fernández-Hall taught at Colegio Belga and the Instituto Normal Central para Señoritas Belén. When she moved to Brazil to continue her studies, she joined the foreign service and served as Cultural Attache for Guatemala.

After graduation, she had a lengthy diplomatic career, representing Guatemala in Greece, Israel and Costa Rica. She was the first female ambassador of Guatemala and was listed as the Chargé d'affaires to Israel in 1956 in the government yearbook. While serving as ambassador in 1959, she helped musician Jorge Sarmientos launch his international career, and in 1960 she met Golda Meir. She attended and spoke on "the current status of engineers and scientists" at the first International Conference of Women Engineers and Scientists in New York in 1964. In 1975 Fernández-Hall transferred to Costa Rica, where she served until 1981. While in Israel, she served as Dean of the foreign diplomatic corps.

Fernández-Hall died on 27 November 2001 and was buried in the General Cemetery in Guatemala City.

== Awards ==
- 1947 Premio Unión y Labor (academic award) Universidad de San Carlos de Guatemala
- 1997 Medal of Honor for Merit Universidad de San Carlos de Guatemala
- Order of the Quetzal
- 2001 Silver Crest from the National Council of Women of Guatemala
