= Unión Femenina Guatemalteca Pro-ciudadanía =

Unión Femenina Guatemalteca Pro-ciudadanía (Guatemalan Feminine Pro-Citizenship Union) was a women's organization in Guatemala, founded in 1944. It played an important role in the campaign for women's suffrage in Guatemala.

The Unión Femenina was founded by the first female lawyer in Guatemala, Graciela Quan, who served as its president. The organization launched an intensive campaign for women's suffrage. It participated in the struggle against the right wing dictatorship of Jorge Ubico, and when the regime fell in 1945, the left wing government Juan José Arévalos granted the wish of the organization and granted women's suffrage. The right was however conditional, and universal women's suffrage was introduced in 1965.
