= Urca =

- Neighborhood
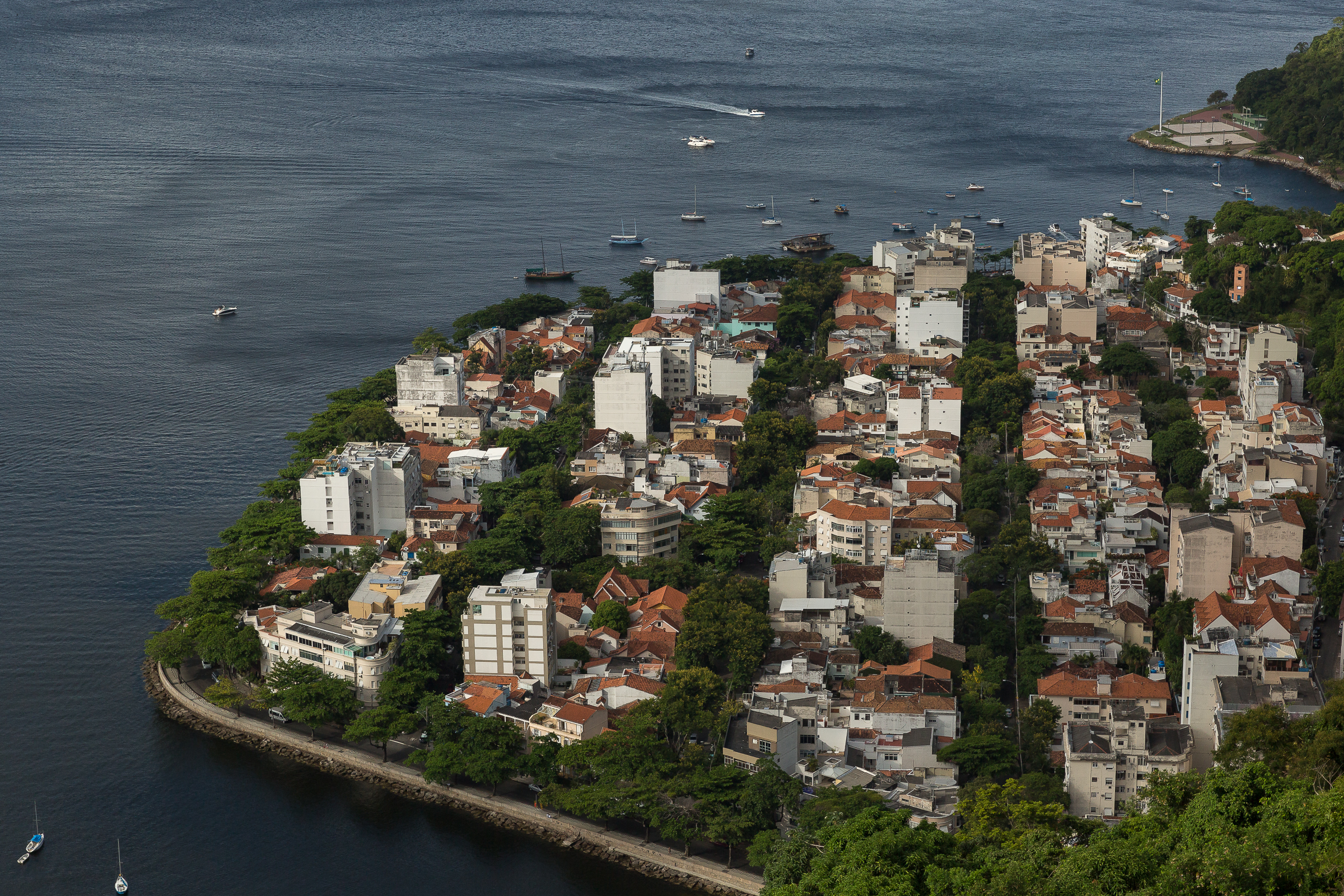

- Location in Rio de Janeiro Urca (Brazil)
- Coordinates: 22°56′56″S 43°09′56″W
- Country: Brazil
- State: Rio de Janeiro (RJ)
- Municipality/City: Rio de Janeiro
- Zone: South Zone

Urca is a residential neighborhood in Rio de Janeiro, Brazil, with a population of nearly 7,000. Although most of the neighborhood dates from the 1920s, parts of it are much older. What is now called the Forte São João, a military base at the foot of the Sugarloaf Mountain, is where the first Portuguese settlement in Rio was founded by Estácio de Sá on March 1, 1565. The French had arrived 12 years earlier and founded a settlement, called France Antarctique, close to what is now Flamengo and Gloria districts, in downtown Rio. The French, riven by internal disputes between Catholics and Protestants, were massacred by the Portuguese and their Indian allies in attacks organised from here, expelling them from the nearby Villegagnon Island (named after the French commander Nicolas Durand de Villegaignon). The street now called Rua São Sebastião, in Urca, which leads from behind the fort to the Urca casino, was originally a trail from the Portuguese fort skirting the edge of the sea to the mainland along the peninsula that houses the Sugar Loaf and a smaller hill, the Morro da Urca. Rua São Sebastião thus has some claim to be the oldest street in Rio.

== History ==
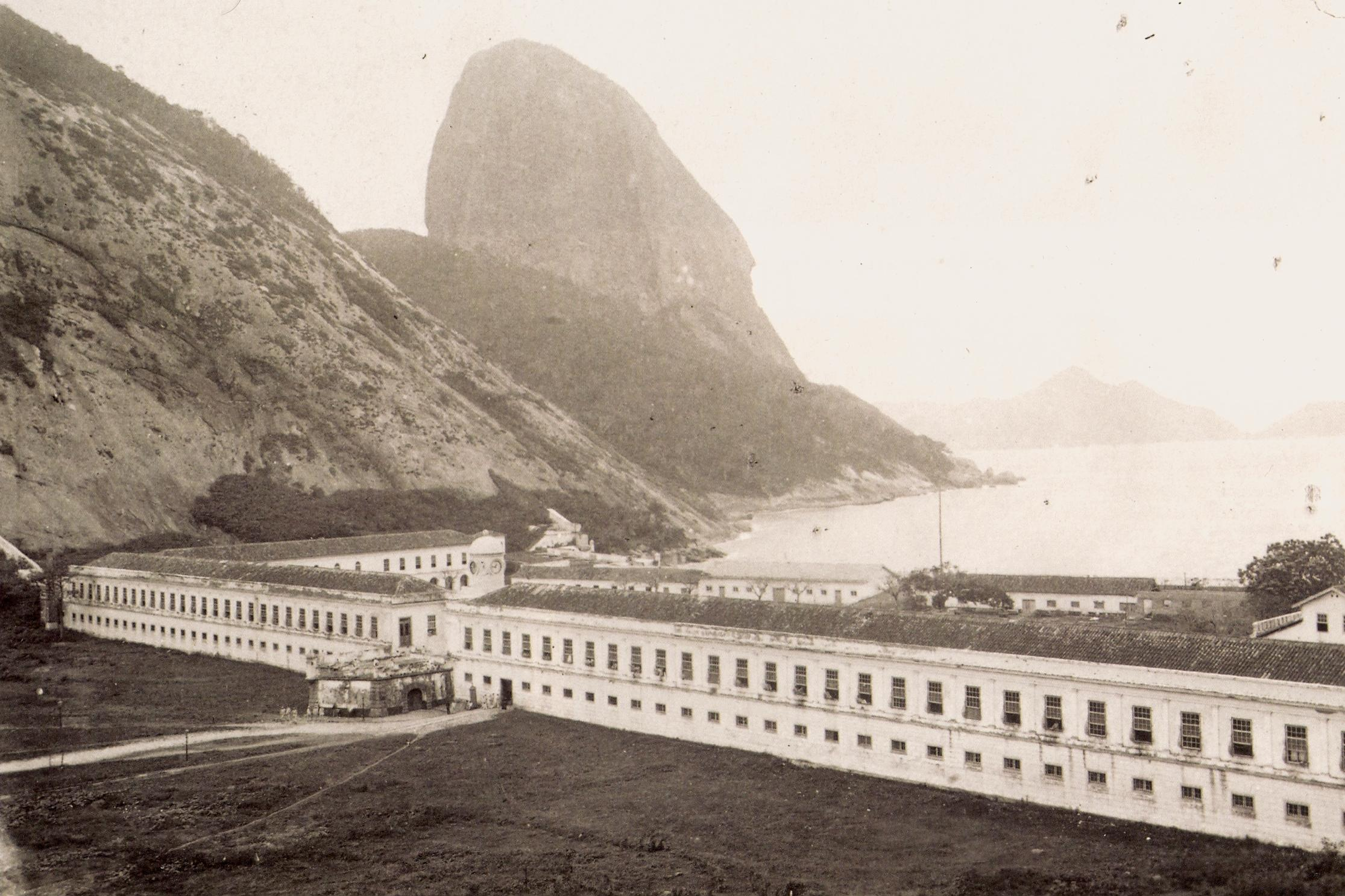
Military School of Praia Vermelha in 1888.

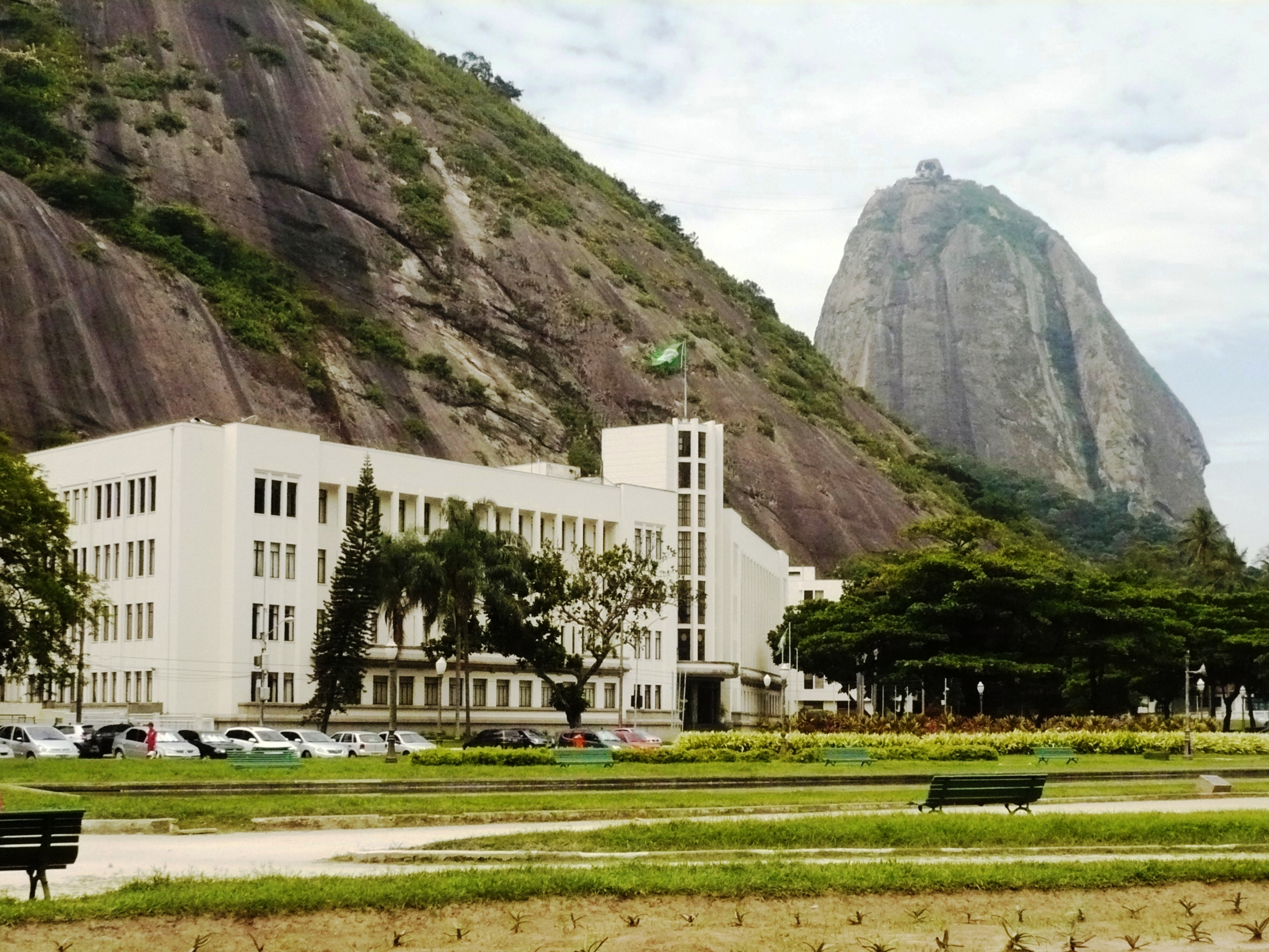
Escola de Comando e Estado-Maior do Exército

Building space in Rio is restricted by the city's geography, which presents physical barriers to urban expansion. The notion of filling in part of the shallow bay around the Morro Vermelho and building a neighborhood on it was mooted periodically in the nineteenth century, and in the 1880s a development company was formed for the purpose, Urbanização Carioca. It has been suggested that the company's acronym, Urca, gave the neighbourhood its name. However, some historians contest this, identifying the name Urca already stamped in 18th century maps. "Urca", in old Portuguese tradition, designates a small and large cargo ship. Legal wrangles over financing and land titles delayed work for a generation, but the landfill began shortly after the conclusion of World War I and the first houses were built in 1922. The centrepiece of the new neighbourhood was a cassino, originally conceived as a competitor to the newly installed cassino in the luxury Copacabana Palace hotel, in those days a rather longer and more inconvenient haul from downtown Rio.

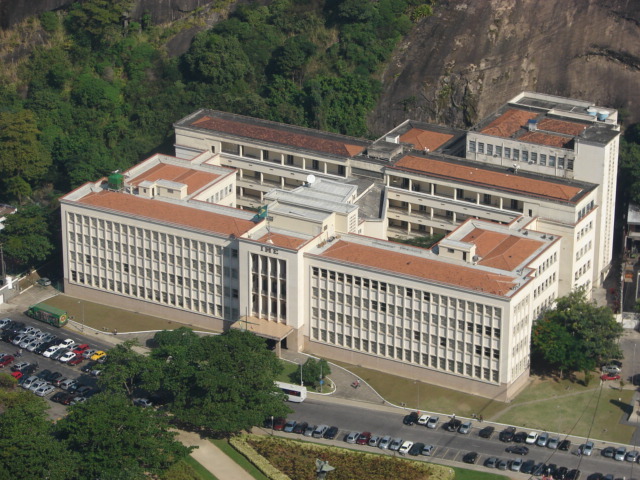
Military Institute of Engineering

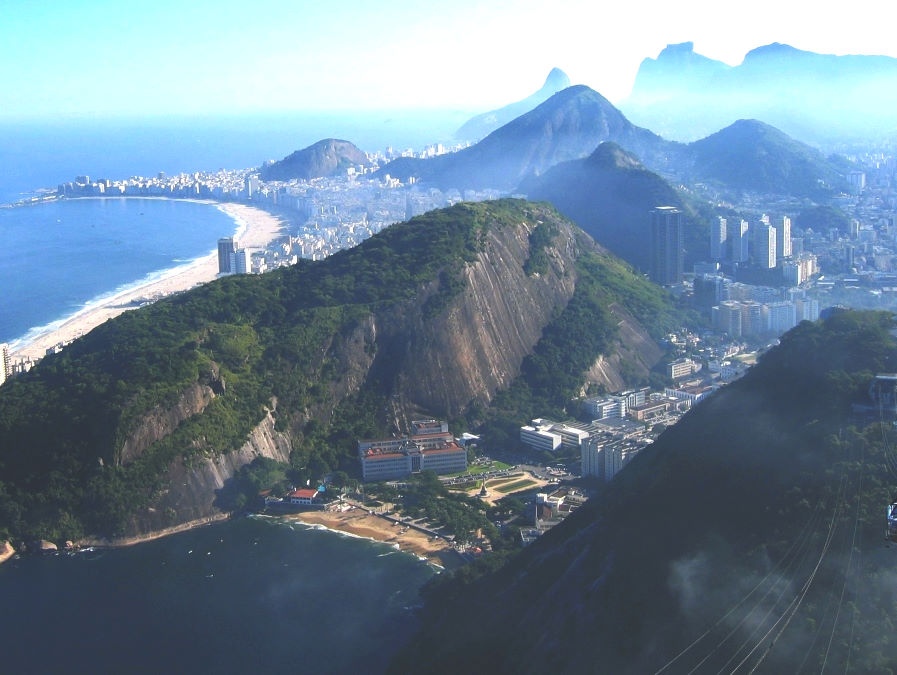
Praia Vermelha beach seen from the Sugar Loaf

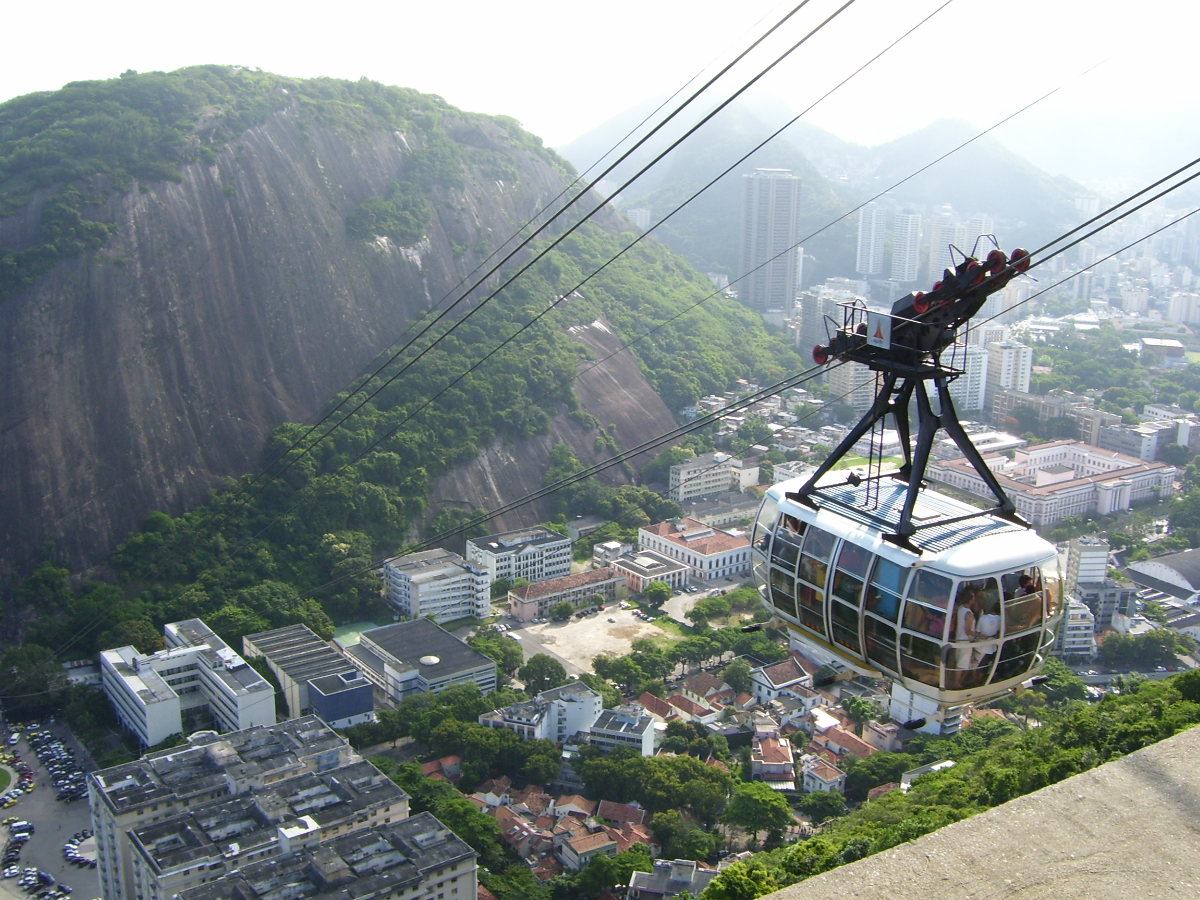
In the foreground, the Sugar Loaf cable car. In the background, commercial buildings.

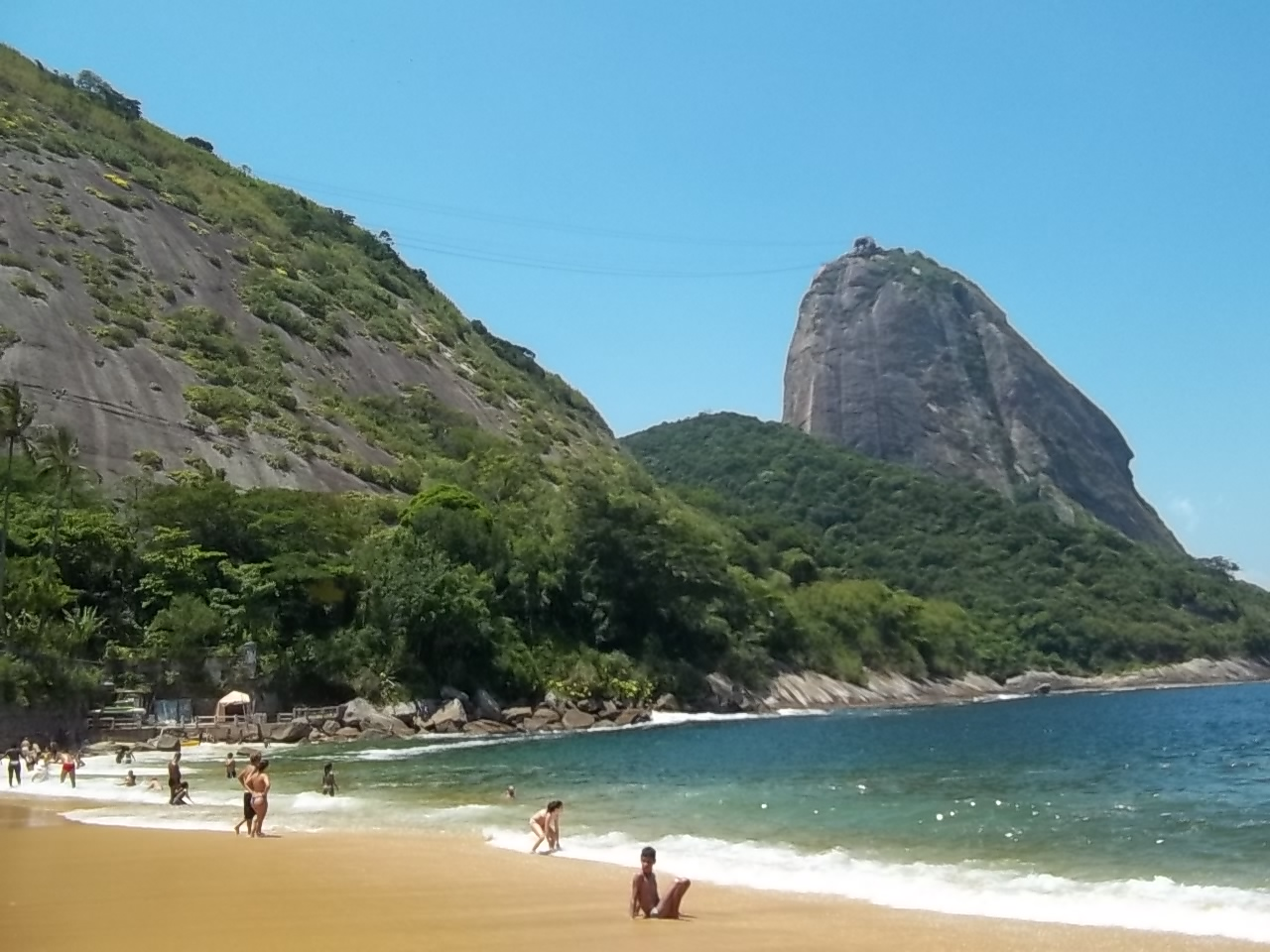
Praia Vermelha (Red Beach) with view of Urca and Sugar Loaf hills

Photos of the area in the 1930s show lots divided up, a low sea wall, individual houses and the trees so characteristic of the area now as saplings. The developers of Urca divided up the neighbourhood into lots and sold them to small investors, many of them recent European immigrants, especially Portuguese, of relatively modest means – the richer middle class headed for the more glamorous neighbourhoods of Copacabana and Leme, on the other side of Praia Vermelha. The heavy military presence around Urca in the coup-prone 1920s was also a disincentive for those with money to move into the area. Many of the present inhabitants of Urca are the descendants of families who bought houses or plots when the area was originally developed.

Most of Urca's residential houses date from the late 1920s to the late 1940s and are a portfolio of house styles popular at the time: art deco houses and apartment buildings, the faux Spanish colonial style (locally called Manuelino style after the 16th-century Portuguese king Manuel I) and mock Tudor houses. The seafront Avenida Luis Alves has a number of modest apartment buildings, most from the 1950s and 1960s, but to a far lesser extent than any other neighbourhood in the Zona Sul. The commercial Rua Marechal Cantuária which leads traffic into the heart of Urca is the only street to have suffered significant redevelopment, but even then at a low level and very little since the 1960s. It is much used by filmmakers and novela producers looking for period settings.

The casino flourished and was a fixture of Rio's social scene in the prewar and immediate postwar period. Singer Carmen Miranda was discovered by a Hollywood producer visiting the casino in 1938, where she was performing. She rented a small house on Rua São Sebastião, now indicated by a plaque on the wall which is the only one in Rio commemorating a famous person's house. The casino also played a minor role in the history of astrophysics. Two scientists in the casino, discussing a model explaining neutrino emission patterns in the cooling of stars, named it after the casino when they noticed how rapidly money, like energy pulsing from a dying star, disappeared from the roulette table.

In 1946 a federal ban on casinos put the Cassino da Urca out of business. The building was later acquired by TV Tupí, a television station owned by Assis Chateaubriand, the first Brazilian media mogul. TV Tupi built a new frontage for the building onto the beach, increasing its internal space and turning the curved 1930s exterior into a plain right-angled building. The TV Tupi studio was used for Chacrinha, a variety program which ran on weekend afternoons from the 1960s to the 1980s, with an enormous national audience. A slot on Chacrinha was highly sought after for upcoming musicians, dancers and actors. The studios closed in the late 1980s, and the casino was left abandoned until 2008. It is currently being renovated to serve as a design institute.

Forte São João is a typical early seventeenth-century Portuguese fort, like many others around the country, with several original cannons. A number of Art Deco buildings are nearby, including a gymnasium built in 1932. A football field next to the gymnasium was used as a training ground by the England squad in the 2014 World Cup.

== See also ==
- Escola de Comando e Estado-Maior do Exército (Brazil) - Brazilian Army Command and Staff College
- Military Institute of Engineering
- Pista Cláudio Coutinho – local walking trail
