= Instituto Militar de Engenharia =

Engineering institute in Rio de Janeiro, Brazil

Army Engineering Institute
- Instituto Militar de Engenharia
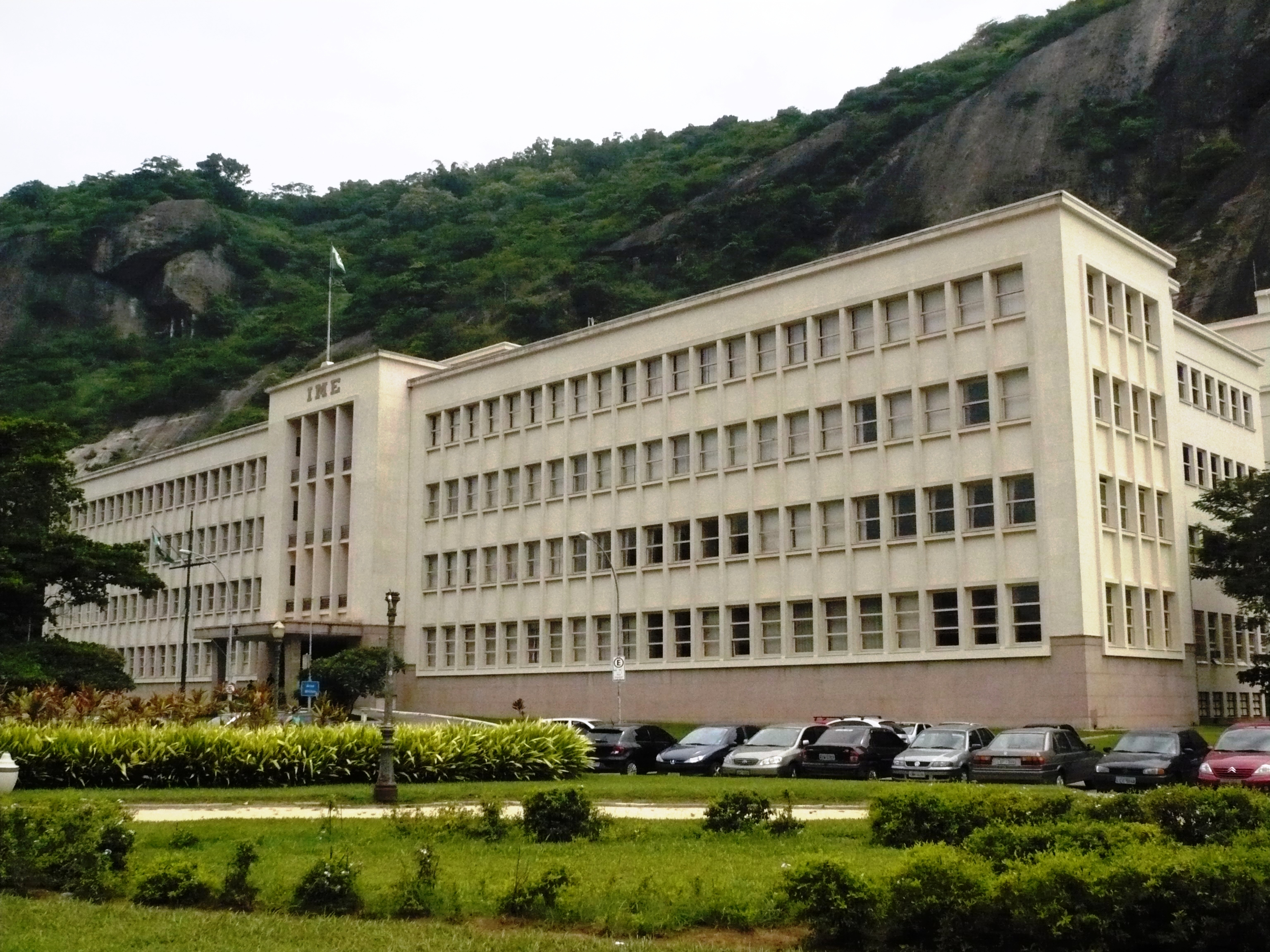
- Type: Public
- Established: December 17, 1792; 233 years ago
- Rector: Gen. Juraci Ferreira Galdino
- Undergraduates: 400 - 450
- Location: Rio de Janeiro, RJ, Brazil; 22°57′22″S 43°09′59″W
- Campus: Urban, Praça General Tibúrcio, Urca
- Website: Official website

The Instituto Militar de Engenharia (IME; English: Army Engineering Institute) is an engineering institute maintained by the Brazilian Army with federal support. IME is the oldest and one of the best ranked engineering schools in Brazil, according to the Brazilian Ministry of Education.

Its current campus is located in Urca, Rio de Janeiro, opposite the entrance to the Sugar Loaf cable car.

== History ==
The Institute was founded by the Maria I during colonial administration in 1792, as the Real Academia de Artilharia, Fortificação e Desenho (Royal Academy of Artillery, Fortification and Drawing), on the model of the Fortification, Artillery and Drawing Academy of Lisbon. IME is the third-oldest engineering school in the world and the oldest in Americas. The school is known for having produced some of Brazil's most notable researchers and public figures.

== Teaching and admission ==
The school's undergraduate admission exam is considered one of the most difficult in the country, due to the high level of the questions presented on the tests. Applicants are evaluated through a set of examinations in Math, Physics, Chemistry, Portuguese and English. The exam questions feature exercises from previous Mathematics, Physics and Chemistry Olympiads, as well as new ones.

The Brazilian Ministry of Education develops a periodical evaluation (both through tests applied on undergraduate students and infrastructure and faculty evaluation), and IME is usually ranked among the top three schools of the country in each of its Engineering disciplines.

== Engineering programs ==
- Civil Engineering Department
  - Civil Engineering B.Sc.
  - Transportation Engineering M.Sc.
- Electrical Engineering Department
  - Electrical Engineering B.Sc.
  - Electronics Engineering B.Sc.
  - Electrical Engineering M.Sc.
  - Telecommunications Engineering B.Sc.
- Mechanical Engineering Department
  - Mechanical and Automotive Engineering B.Sc.
  - Armament Mechanics Engineering B.Sc.
  - Materials Engineering B.Sc.
  - Materials Science M.Sc.
  - Materials Science D.Sc.
- Chemical Engineering Department
  - Chemical Engineering B.Sc.
  - Chemistry M.Sc.
  - Chemistry D.Sc.
- Cartography Engineering Department
  - Cartography Engineering B.Sc.
  - Cartography Engineering M.Sc.
- Computer Engineering Department
  - Computer Engineering B.Sc.
  - Computing and Systems M.Sc.
- Defense Engineering Graduate Program
  - Defense Engineering M.Sc.
  - Defense Engineering D.Sc.
- Nuclear engineering Department
  - Nuclear Engineering M.Sc.

== Notable alumni ==
- Euclides da Cunha, Writer and sociologist
- Casimiro Montenegro Filho, Founder of the Technological Institute of Aeronautics
- Francisca Fernández-Hall Zúñiga, Guatemalan, first female graduate—class of 1950
- Tarcísio de Freitas, Governor of São Paulo

== See also ==
- Brazil University Rankings
- Universities and Higher Education in Brazil
- Escola de Comando e Estado-Maior do Exército (Brazil)
