= Pista Cláudio Coutinho =

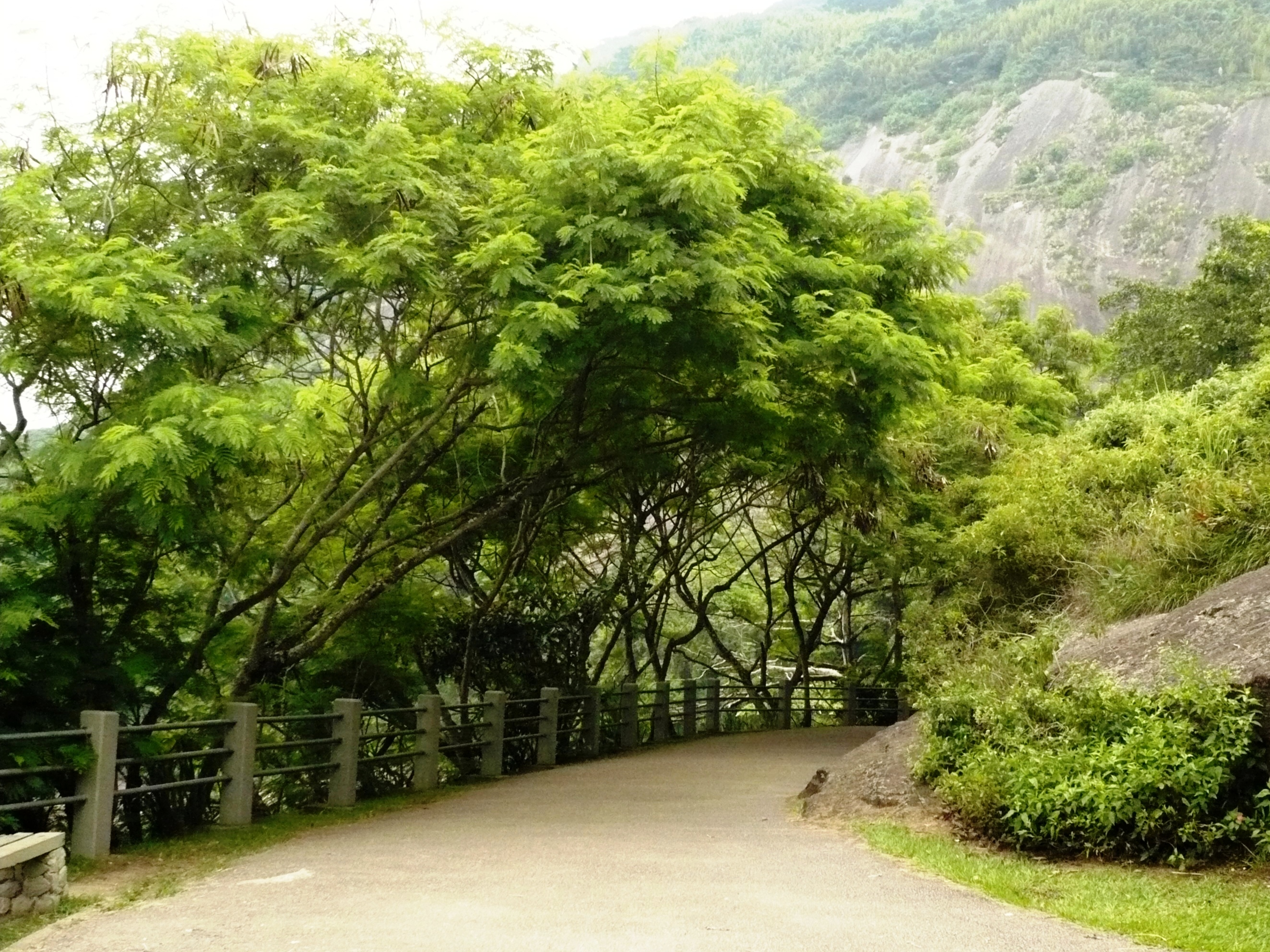

The Pista Cláudio Coutinho is a walking/running trail located beneath Sugarloaf Mountain in the Rio de Janeiro neighborhood of Urca. The paved trail is 1.25 km long, has many native Brazilian trees with lots of birds and small monkeys. Halfway down the trail is the entrance to the unpaved trail that leads to the top of the first of Sugarloaf Mountain's two humps. The area is frequented by families, tourists and local runners.
