= Manuel Antonio de Jesús Alvarado =

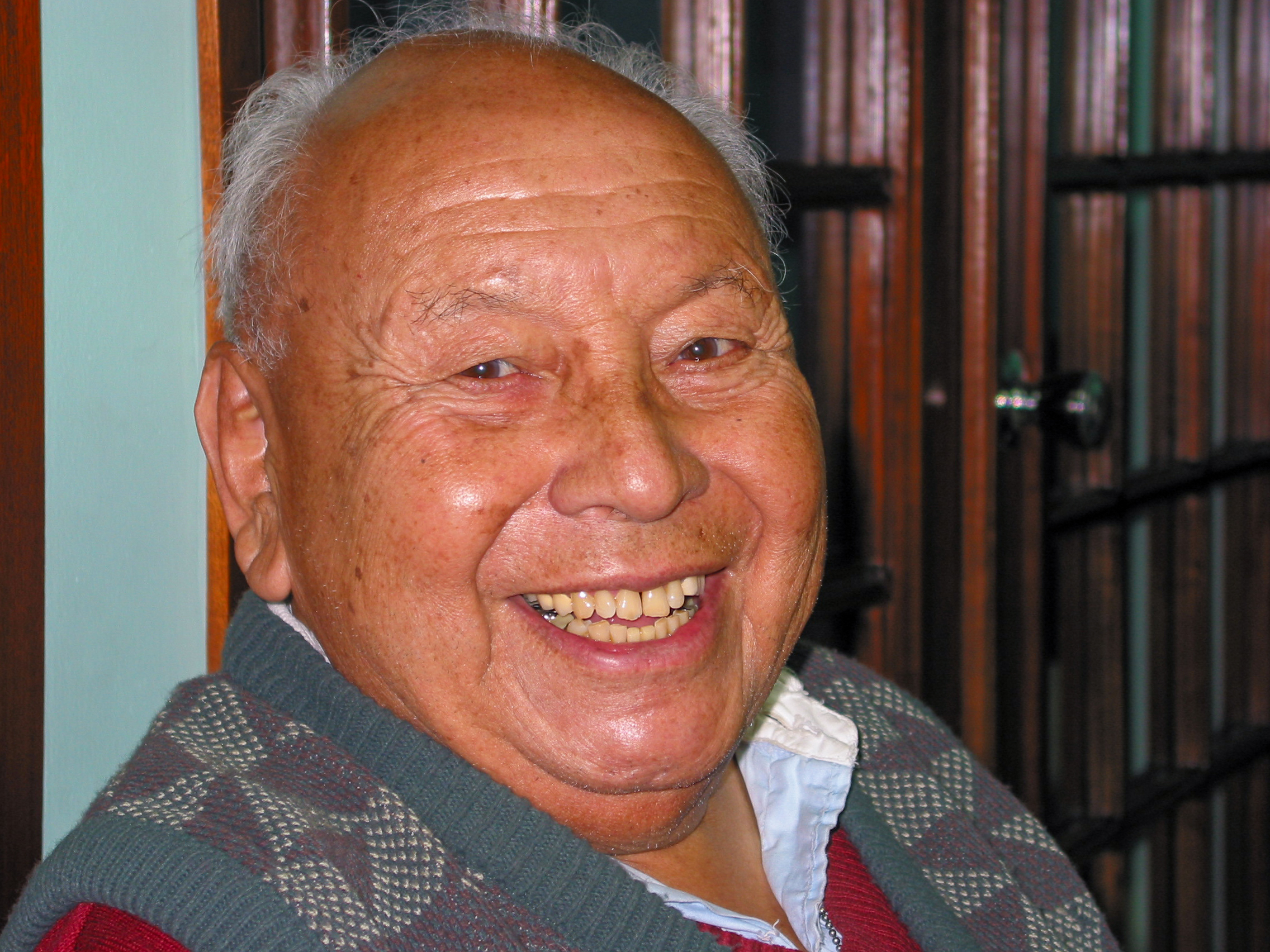
- Born: December 23, 1919; Escuintla, Escuintla, Guatemala
- Died: January 2, 2011 (aged 91); Guatemala City, Guatemala
- Other names: Manuel Alvarado, Manuel Alvarado Coronado
- Occupation(s): Musician, musical educator
- Years active: 1937 - 2000
- Known for: Guatemala Youth Symphony
- Spouse: Rosalind Browning
- Children: Manuel Alvarado, Paulo Alvarado, Felix Alvarado
- Awards: Orden Francisco Marroquín, Order of the Quetzal

Manuel Antonio de Jesus Alvarado (1919-2011) was a musician, conductor and music educator born in Guatemala. He studied harmony, composing and conducting and graduated as a cellist from the Guatemala National Music Conservatoire and received a master's in musical education (?) from the Royal Manchester College of Music. In 1970 he founded the Guatemala Youth Symphony, which he led until its dissolution in 2000. He was awarded the Francisco Marroquin Order from the government of Guatemala for his lifelong dedication to music education.
