= Emilia Serrano de Wilson =

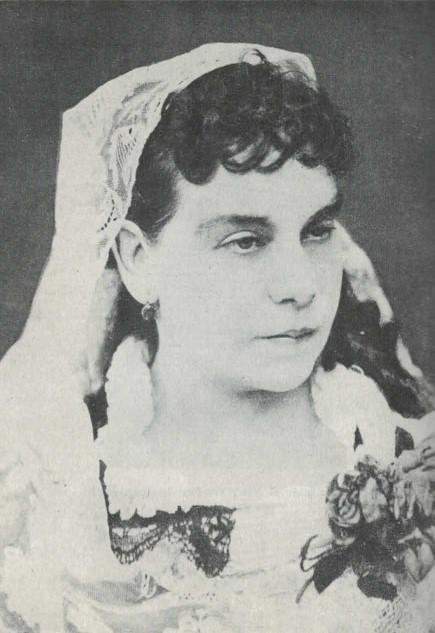
- Emilia Serrano y García (1854)
- Born: Emilia Serrano y García ca. January 3, 1834; Granada, Spain
- Died: January 1, 1923; Barcelona, Spain
- Resting place: Montjuïc Cemetery
- Occupations: writer; journalist
- Partner: José Zorrilla
- Children: 1
- Writing career
- Pen name: Emilia Serrano de Wilson; Baronesa de Wilson; Emilia Serrano de Tornel
- Genres: novels; travel

Emilia Serrano y García (Granada, ca. January 3, 1834 - Barcelona, January 1, 1923) was a Spanish writer and journalist. A traveler throughout the Latin American continent, one of the most praised characteristics of her career has been her feminist work. Serrano used the pseudonyms Emilia Serrano de Wilson, Baronesa de Wilson, and Emilia Serrano de Tornel. In addition to being a novelist, she was the author of works on history and education. Between 1857 and 1861, she directed the newspapers La Caprichosa and La Nueva Caprichosa in Madrid. She also collaborated on El Eco Ferrolano, El Último Figurín, El Correo de la Moda, Las Hijas del Sol, La Primera Edad, El Gato Negro, La Ilustración Artística, and Álbum Salón. Serrano, who made several trips around Latin America throughout her life, left written works such as Maravillas americanas and América y sus mujeres in relation to her stay in the American continent.

== Early life ==
Emilia Serrano y García was born into a privileged family. She was daughter of the notary and diplomat Ramón Serrano y García and María Purificación García y Cano, both natives of Valladolid. We know that she wrote an autobiography conditioned by her influences in the Parisian intellectual and bourgeois circle. (Note: The autobiography cannot be considered reliable, because, as some scholars suggest, the writer simply "constructed herself for the gaze of others.") It has been said that Serrano was born in Granada, however, many doubt this statement and think that the place of the author's birth is unknown. Likewise, the date is unknown, both the day and the year, although some believe the year was 1833, and others 1834, among various options. She indicates that she was born in 1845, but other sources of information, such as her death certificate, suggest that she was born about ten years earlier. Despite the unknown details of the author, it is known for certain that she lived in a privileged family and was endowed with a refined culture and an intellectual environment from her youth. All these factors together with her contact with late romanticism shaped her taste and were reflected in her work. In addition, from her youth, she dedicated herself to journalism and published numerous articles until the 1870s.

== Career ==
=== Exile in France ===
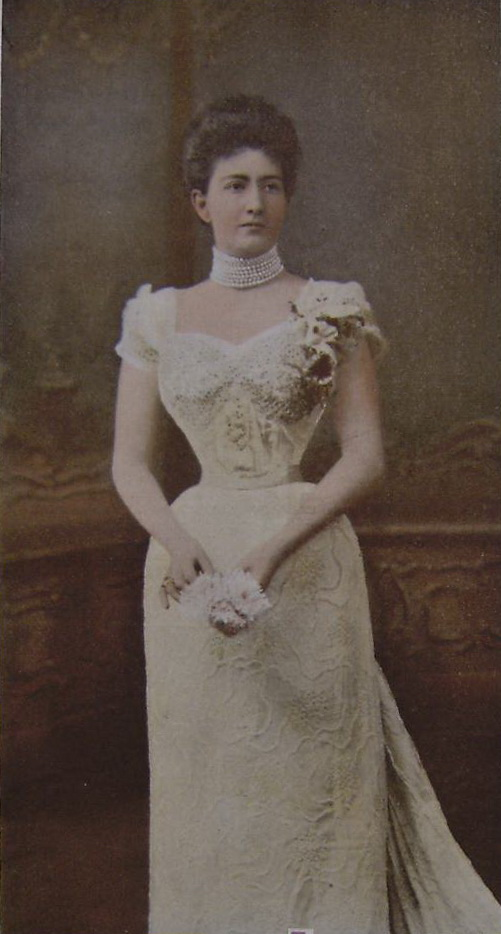
(undated)

In 1852, Serrano fled to Paris in exile, followed by her lover, José Zorrilla, who called her "Leila" in his verses, and with whom she had a daughter Margarita Aurora, who died prematurely at the age of four. This event caused the lovers to distance themselves. It has been said that her nickname, the "Baroness of Wilson", came from her first husband, the Baron of Wilson, who she was widowed by two years after getting married, and to whom she attributed the paternity of her daughter. However, there is no evidence of such a relationship or even that Serrano ever married a Baron or the Catalan doctor Antonio García Tornel, whom she supposedly married in 1874. What is proven is that one of her great hobbies consisted of fantasizing about her family origins and hiding her past, and in feeding her character. "She became a writer for mothers, and a writer to educate young people, young ladies. That is why she needed to create a moral and impeccable biography. How are you going to educate future mothers, marriageable young women, and how are you going to get them into religious schools with your books? She uses social rules to her advantage, without giving up the freedom she wants for her life. She is very modern and performative," says Fernández (2023), who also points out that, although the Baroness was a complex and paradoxical character, her feminist legacy is beyond doubt.

Serrano's stay in Paris was notable as she would rub shoulders with great personalities and French romantic writers, such as Alphonse de Lamartine and Alexandre Dumas. She became the first international literary agent of the latter, as his representative and manager of his rights to translate into Spanish. In 1857, during her stay in Paris, she founded and directed, until 1860, the women's fashion magazine La Caprichosa, which was very successful both in Spain and throughout Latin America.

=== Return to Spain ===
In 1860, she returned to Spain, where she achieved a relevant role in the cultural world and in the court of Isabel II. After the death of her daughter, Serrano's first trip to Latin America is recorded around 1865, due to the depression caused by the loss. She claimed that since she was a child, she felt a powerful attraction to the American continent, due to the readings in the family library, the reading of great scientific travelers of the 19th century, and her reflection on the union between all Spanish-speaking peoples "so close, so intimate, so great and useful for all as unbreakable".

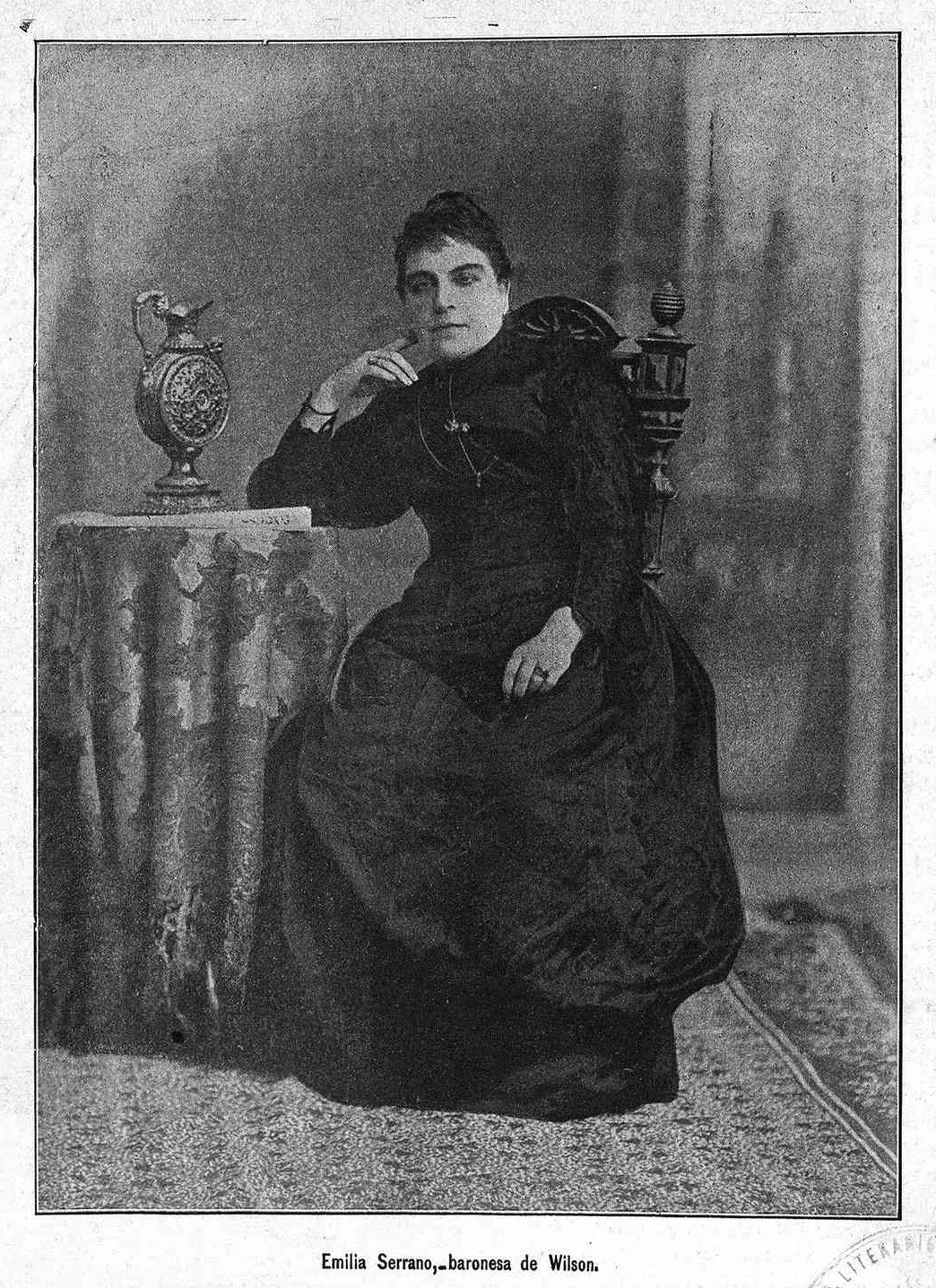
In La Ilustración Nacional (1898)

All this would later lead her to write her travel literature for which she became so well known and to travel there. Los Viajes de Colon: el descubrimiento de America, the Historia de las Indias, by Father Las Casas, La Araucana, by Ercilla, and other works, were the origin of my enthusiasm for America. The scenes of the life of the Indians, described graphically; the discoveries and conquest, the battles, the heroics of the Spanish and the indigenous, the tenacious and just struggle of the sons of the New World against the invaders, alienated me to the point of forgetting everything that was not reading, giving up walks and others".

From then on until 1914, her visits to different countries in Latin America would be repeated more than five times. First World War and Serrano's failing health did not allow her to travel to Latin America any further.7 Her audacity, her training and cosmopolitanism helped her to draw social and personal networks that connected her with great cultural and political personalities of the century. Thanks to this, she became an advisor to rulers, such as the Mexican president, Porfirio Díaz, and an official historian of countries such as Venezuela or Mexico, as well as the most widely disseminated author in Latin American schools. All this made the writer one of the most significant figures in travel literature of the 19th century.

She also increased her journalistic activity, especially in Barcelona, where she settled in the late 1880s and early 1890s to carry out commercial projects with Latin America. In total, she published 39 writings in La Ilustración Artística de Barcelona, between 1887 and 1916, whose main theme was stories with an Americanist theme.

She rescued news about the life and work of numerous contemporary writers, but also of prominent philanthropists, artists or forgotten heroines.

== Later life ==
She spent the last years of her life dedicated to the unfinished Historia General de América until she died on January 1, 1923. Her body was buried in the Montjuïc Cemetery.

== Selected works ==
Manual, ó sea, Guía de los viajeros en la Gran Bretaña (1860)

La ley del progreso (1883)

Americanos célebres (1888)

=== Books ===
- 1858. Las Siete palabras de Cristo en la cruz, poema en verso por ...
- 1859. El Camino de la Cruz, poema en verso
- 1860. Manual, ó sea, Guía de los viajeros en la Gran Bretaña
- 1860. El almacén de las señoritas
- 1860. Alfonso el Grande. Poema histórico
- 1861. ¡¡Pobre Ana!! legenda historica (in verse)
- 1870. El Angel de paz, colección de novelas morales, por la baronesa de Wilson
- 1883. La ley del progreso
- 1883. Las perlas del corazón
- 1884. Lágrimas y sonrisas: poesías líricas
- 1888. Americanos célebres
- 1890. América y sus mujeres
- 1890. El mártir de Izancanac
- 1897. América en fin de siglo
- 1903. El mundo literario americano. Escritores contemporáneos.
- 1903. México y sus gobernantes : de 1519 a 1910 : biografías, retratos y autógrafos
- 1910. Maravillas americanas Maravillas Americanas: curiosidades geológicas y arqueológicas. Tradiciones leyendas. Algo de todo
- 1910. El parnaso chileno
- 1910. Parnaso chileno, aum. con una segunda serie por la baronesa de Wilson
- 1924. Almacén de las señoritas: Contiene lecciones de differentes
- 1958. México y sus gobernantes de 1519 a 1910: biografías, ... - '
- (no publication date found) Magdalena
- (no publication date found) Misterio del alma

=== Newspapers ===
- 1854. El Eco hispano-americano. (Madrid)
- 1871–1872. El último figurín. (Madrid)
- 1877–1878. Semanario del pacífico. (Lima)
- 1906–1912. La Nueva caprichosa (Havana)
- (undated). El continente americano (Mexico City)
- (undated). La Crónica ilustrada (Barcelona)

== Bibliography ==
- (2000) Correa Ramón, Amelina, “Plumas femeninas en el ‘fin de siglo’ español: del ‘ángel del hogar’ a la feminista comprometida: Emilia Serrano García”, Ojáncano. Revista de literatura española, University of North Carolina and University of Georgia, n.º 18, abril, pp. 61–96.
- Sosa de Newton, Lily (2004). "Mujeres españolas en la Argentina". Cuadernos Hispanoamericanos (in Spanish) (651): 97–104. ISSN 0011-250X.
