= Manuel Alvarado =

Guatemalan-born British academic

- Born: 15 March 1948; Guatemala
- Died: 30 April 2010 (aged 62)
- Occupation: Media Studies
- Known for: Promoting media education
- Board member of: Sir John Cass's Foundation
- Spouses: Scilla Alvarado, Tana Wollen
- Parent: Manuel Antonio de Jesús Alvarado

Academic background
- Education: Swansea University

Academic work
- Discipline: Media Studies
- Institutions: British Film Institute

Manuel Bernardo Alvarado Green (15 March 1948 – 30 April 2010) was a Guatemalan-born British academic, who specialized in media studies. During his career he was secretary of the Society for Education in Film and Television and the editor of Screen Education. He also served as head of education at the British Film Institute and lectured at West Surrey College of Art and Design, Luton University, Sunderland University and City University.

== Selected works ==
- Doctor Who: The Unfolding Text (1983)
- Made for Television: Euston Films Ltd (1985)
- East of Dallas: The European Challenge to American Television (1988)
- The Media Reader (1990)
