= Angelina Acuña =

Guatemalan writer

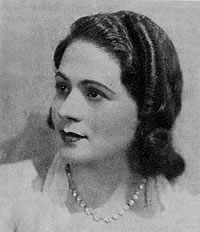
- Born: María Angelina Acuña Sagastume; 31 January 1904; Jutiapa, Guatemala
- Died: 14 June 2006 (aged 101); Jutiapa, Guatemala
- Occupations: Writer, educator
- Years active: 1938–1999

María Angelina Acuña Sagastume de Castañeda (31 January 1905 – 14 June 2006) was a Guatemalan writer of prose and poetry. A major poetry figure in her country, she was especially known for her rigor in managing classical verse within the sonnet. The writer Margarita Carrera called Acuña the "sister in spirit of Gabriela Mistral".

== Biography ==
María Angelina Acuña Sagastume de Castañeda was born in Jutiapa to Francisco Acuña and Adela Sagastume de Acuña.

She moved to Guatemala City where she studied to become a teacher of Primary Education. She earned a Bachelor of Science and Letters at Instituto Normal Central para Señoritas Belén. After graduating, she worked in teaching institutes such as Instituto Normal Central para Señoritas Belén and the Instituto Nacional Centroamérica (INCA). She taught as a visiting professor at Florida Southern College (Lakeland, Florida). Acuña began publishing poetry in the 1930s and was one of the most prolific women poets in Guatemala, publishing in the newspaper El Imparcial, the leading woman's magazine Nosotras, as well as in bound collections.

She participated in many poetry contests, winning numerous awards, as a means to open the door to publishing and her skillful use of language helped her succeed and gain recognition a society which still mostly believed that men's intelligence was superior to women's.

Unlike some of her fellow Guatemalan female writers, like Elisa Hall de Asturias who gave up writing due to the then-prevalent misogyny, or Magdalena Spínola who faced ostracism during the dictatorship of Jorge Ubico Castañeda, Acuña was able to manipulate language and use poetic forms to address the culture without appearing to be a threat. Rather than promoting the heroic fatherland united under "Father God", Acuña celebrated her nationalism by employing imagery of mother earth's fertility to evoke both pride in her homeland and address the patriarchy of her times without explicit confrontation.

In 1938, she participated in an anthology called Colección lila with Olga Violeta Luna de Marroquín, María del Pilar de Garcia, and Magdalena Spínola, which was Central America's first women's poetry collection, both written and published by women. She founded and directed for several literary journals throughout her career and was a member of the Academia Guatemalteca de la Lengua.

In 1944, she joined with a group of women including Elisa Hall de Asturias, Berta Corleto, Gloria Méndez Mina de Padilla, Rosa de Mora, Irene de Peyré, and Graciela Quan to form the Unión Femenina Guatemalteca Pro-ciudadanía (Union of Guatemalan Women for Citizenship) favoring recognition of their civil rights, including suffrage for literate women. After the Guatemalan 1944 coup d'état the new Constitution, promulgated on 1 March 1945 granted the right to vote to all literate citizens, including women.

== Death ==
Acuña died at the age of 101 in her home in her native Jutiapa, Guatemala.

== Awards ==
- 1960 Woman of the Americas by the Pan American Union of Women in New York
- 1960 Order of Quetzal
- 1974 Order of Francisco Marroquín
- Distinction of Emeritus of Merit by the Faculty of Humanities at the University of San Carlos of Guatemala
- 2005 Quetzal of the Jade Maya, the highest honor of the Quetzal and first ever given to a woman

== Selected works ==
- La gavilla de Ruth (1938)
- Ofrenda Lirica a Guatemala (1939)
- Para que duerma un indito (1952)
- Fiesta de Luciérnagas (1953)
- Madre Américas (1960)
- El llamado de la cumbre (1960)
- Canto de amor en latitud marina (1968)
- Elogio del soneto (1999)
