= Alux Nahual =

Guatemalan rock band

- Alux Nahual from left to right: Ranferi Aguilar, Óscar Conde, Lenin Fernández, Paulo Alvarado.

Background information
- Origin: Guatemala, Guatemala City
- Genres: Progressive rock, rock
- Years active: 1979–1999, 2006–present
- Members: Álvaro Aguilar; Vinicio Molina; Óscar Conde; Paulo Alvarado; Plubio Aguilar; Ranferi Aguilar
- Past members: Jack Shuster; Pablo Mayorga; Orlando Aguilar; Lenín Fernández; Geraldo Estrada

Alux Nahual is a Guatemalan rock band formed in 1979 by brothers Plubio and Álvaro Aguilar, and their cousin Ranferi Aguilar. This band was born in the context of the confrontation between the guerrillas and the army. Alux Nahual (Espíritu del Duende in Spanish or Spirit of the Goblin in English) is a maya-quiche phrase naming a goblin similar to a leprechaun or elf. The band's climax came in 1995 while performing in a sold-out show at Los Angeles Palace.

Other members before 1990 included Pablo Mayorga, Orlando Aguilar and Javier Flores, all drummers. In the year 2006 they had a reunion tour, to raise funds to help the victims of Hurricane Stan, that affected certain regions of Guatemala in year 2005. The band still remains active and has played unplugged concerts in 2007 as well as 2 other shows in the Trovajazz venue in Guatemala the 14th and 15 December 2007. They were billed by the band as the last shows for 2007 perhaps as an indicator of more activity in 2008.

The band's style is characterized by the incorporation of classic instruments like the cello and the flute to rock tunes, ballads and folk songs.

Band members are versed musicians and often switch instruments in live performances from piano to guitar and so on.

They also blend into their music elements of progressive rock. Case in point: the bridge of their classic song "Como un Duende" where they switch time signature and melody.

In their early days, they often rehearsed at the home of their grandmother, Guatemalan poet Magdalena Spínola.

== Band members ==
- Álvaro Aguilar – vocals, guitar
- Rodolfo Lenin Fernández Paz – drums, percussion
- Óscar Conde – flute, keyboard, saxophone
- Paulo Alvarado – cello
- Plubio Eugenio – bass guitar
- Ranferí Aguilar Schinini – guitar
- Jack Schuster – violin, mandolin

== Discography ==
- Alux Nahual (1981)
- Conquista (1982)
- Hermanos de Sentimiento (1984)
- Centroamérica (1986)
- Alto Al fuego (1987)
- La Trampa (1989)
- Leyenda (1990)
- Americamorfósis (1993)
- Se Cantan Retratos (1997)
- Murciélago Danzante (2012)
- Sueños de jade (2016)

== Compilations and Anthologies ==
- Leyenda I (1992)
- Leyenda II (1996)
- Antología I (2001)
- Antología II (2002)
- La Historia del Duende (2002)

== Tribute albums ==
- Espíritu Del Duende I (1998)
- Espíritu Del Duende II (1999)
