= Rosa Castañeda de Mora =

Guatemalan social activist and politician

Member of Congress
- In office 1956–1958
- Constituency: Zacapa

Alma Rosa Castañeda de Mora was a Guatemalan social activist and politician. She was elected to Congress in 1955, becoming its first female member.

== Biography ==
Castañeda did not receive a formal education, only learning to read through lessons by a visiting teacher. She subsequently worked at a legal firm owned by a brother-in-law. In 1925 she married Carlos Federico Mora Portillo (1889–1972), a physician, academic, minister and diplomat. The couple had three children, Federico, Ángela and Cordelia Rosa.

She established the Casa del Niño in 1920 and the National League Against Tuberculosis. She also published El Cuidado del Niño (The Care of Children), which was used by several generations. In November 1955 she was the inaugural winner of the Presna Libre Woman of the Year award.

The following month she was elected to Congress, becoming its first female member. She took office on 15 March 1956, serving until 1958. Her niece Blanca Luz Molina Castañeda later also served in Congress.
