= Instituto Normal Central para Señoritas Belén =

Institution of secondary education

Coordinates: 14.6360°N 90.5096°W

Instituto Normal Central para Señoritas Belén or Instituto Belén is an institution of secondary education in Guatemala, specializing in the training of teachers in urban primary education. It was established on 20 January 1875, and is based in Guatemala City.
