= Graciela Quan =

Guatemalan lawyer and activist

Graciela Quan Valenzuela
- Born: Graciela Quan Valenzuela; 5 January 1911; Guatemala
- Died: 22 January 1999 (aged 88); Guatemala City, Guatemala
- Occupations: Lawyer, women's rights activist, suffragette, diplomat
- Years active: 1943–1999

Graciela Quan Valenzuela (5 January 1911 – 22 January 1999) was a Guatemalan lawyer and activist. She campaigned for women's suffrage, writing a draft proposal for Guatemala's enfranchisement law. She was also a social worker, adviser to the President of Guatemala, delegate to the United Nations and the President of the Inter-American Commission of Women.

== Biography ==
Graciela Quan Valenzuela was born in 1911 in Guatemala and graduated from the Universidad de San Carlos de Guatemala in 1942 as the country's first female attorney. She was the last woman to graduate before women were granted civil rights.

Her thesis, "Ciudadanía opcional para la mujer guatemalteca" ("Citizenship is optional for Guatemalan women") proposed a draft law for granting enfranchisement to women.

In 1944, Quan founded with a group of women, including Angelina Acuña de Castañeda, Elisa Hall de Asturias, and Irene de Peyré, among others, the Unión Femenina Guatemalteca Pro-ciudadanía (Union of Guatemalan Women for Citizenship) favoring recognition of their civil rights, including suffrage for literate women. After the 1944 Guatemalan coup d'état the new Constitution, promulgated on 1 March 1945 granted the right to vote to all literate citizens, including women.

She was one of the organizers of the Primer Congreso Interamericano de Mujeres (First Inter-American Congress of Women) held on 27 August 1947 in Guatemala City, which had as one of its main themes equality of men and women. That same year, she was one of the founders of the Altrusa Club Guatemala, an affiliate of the organization Altrusa International, Inc. The initial goal of the club was to provide impoverished girls with an education; it later expanded to assisting street children and founding the municipal children's library.

Quan served as a delegate to the United Nations in 1956–57 as well as an adviser to President Carlos Castillo Armas on social issues. Between 1957 and 1961 Quan served as Guatemala's representative to the Inter-American Commission of Women and the organization's president.

In 1978, she was recommended as a regional adviser to the Agency for International Development on women's issues in Latin America based upon her previous experience on the United Nations' Human Rights Commission and her pioneering social work in Guatemala.

== Death ==
Quan died on 22 January 1999 in Guatemala City, Guatemala.

== See also ==
- First women lawyers around the world
