= Feminism in Latin America =

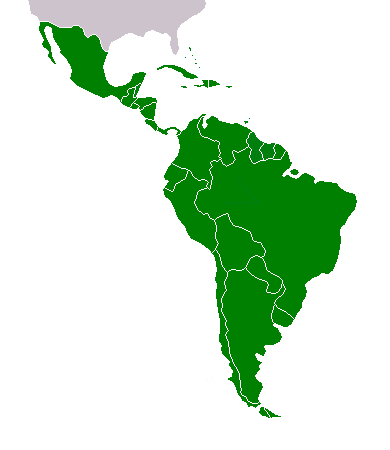
Feminism in Latin America runs through Central America, South America, and the Caribbean

In Latin America, there is a diverse collection of feminist movements aimed at defining, establishing, and achieving equal political, economic, cultural, personal, and social rights for Latin American women. Feminism in Latin America is wide-ranging and refers to feminist movements across the region of South and Central America and the Caribbean. Latin American feminists, like their counterparts in other spheres, are individuals who practice feminism by advocating or supporting the rights and equality of women. Feminism in the Latin American context emerged to challenge gender inequalities and patriarchy against a backdrop of colonialism and a system of racial and class hierarchies. Feminists in Latin America have worked to prioritize region-specific movements with priorities distinct from those of feminists in Europe and North America, while also embracing transnational and intersectional thought.

== Context and History ==
Latin American feminism exists in the context of centuries of colonialism, including the transportation and subjugation of enslaved people from Africa, and the mistreatment of indigenous people. The origins of modern Latin American feminism can be traced back to the 1960s and 1970s social movements, where it encompasses the women's liberation movement, but prior feminist ideas had expanded before there were written records. While feminist movements in the region are often linked to the 1960s and 1970s, when women's liberation organizations began to gain prominence, the historical genealogy of Latin American feminism shows that feminist concepts are much older and more deeply rooted in the region's colonial past. Across various regions in Latin America and the Caribbean, the definition of feminism varies among groups, reflecting cultural, political, and social involvement. The expression of diversity and change from the viewpoint of those who have historically been marginalized, particularly through the experiences of colonialism and patriarchy, has consistently been a focus of feminist philosophy in Latin America.

The emergence of the Latin American feminist movement can be attributed to five key factors. It has been said that the beginning of the revolution for Latin American feminism started in the 1800s with two women, Manuela Sáenz in Ecuador and Juana Manuela Gorriti in Argentina. Before these movements, women had almost no rights under colonial rule. However, women from wealthier European families had more educational opportunities. Then, in the 1920s, feminism was reignited and shifted toward political and educational reforms for women's rights. In the 1930-50s, a group of Puerto Rican women founded what is now considered the movement for Latin American women. Some of these movements included the founding of the needle industry, such as factory work as seamstresses. Then, in the 1960s, the movement shifted to advocate for women's bodily and economic rights. The 1970s saw a downfall in the movement due to laissez-faire liberalism combined with free-market capitalism. After the fall of neoliberalism, the 1980s brought a resurgence of the feminist movement towards political rights. The 1980s also began to shed light on the topic of domestic violence. The 1990s made strides towards legal equality for women. In today's society, Latin American feminism has been broken down into multiple subcategories based on ethnicity or topic.

Some early Feminist movements in Latin America have built on the foundations of historical movements of these types of organizations while evolving to address new political and social challenges and situations. Recent work in this field shows that transnational feminist networks and digital activism have improved how feminists have organized across borders and regions, in campaigns such as Ni Una Menos, women mobilized against gender-based violence and femicide. Grassroots feminism along with social media has increased knowledge and placed pressure on governments to correct inequalities. Recent studies have zeroed in on the importance of intersectionality and decolonial approaches with a priority on experiences of Indigenous, Afro-descendant, and marginalized women. Feminist movements in Latin America in recent times have moved on from a focus on human rights to emancipatory projects, in an effort to solve economic justice issues, political participation, and social transformation.

== Latin American and Latino feminist theory ==
Since feminist theory often relies on Western literary works rather than personal experiences, Latin American feminist theory is a construct that has only recently emerged to confer legitimacy on Latina women in Eurocentric contexts. Latin American feminist theorists are known to draw on sources not only from Western countries but also from Latin American history, personal accounts, and research in the social sciences. There is a controversy known as "epistemic privilege" (epistemic privilege is known as the privilege a person knows or has first-hand experience on a particular subject. For example, a woman would know what issues impact them more than a man would), regarding how most Latina feminist philosophers enjoy a cultural and economic privilege that distances them from the living conditions of the majority of Latin American women. Feminist philosopher Ofelia Schutte has argued that "feminist philosophy requires a home in a broader Latin American Feminist theory and not in the discipline of philosophy in Latin America."

Because Latin America is a vast region, the diversity of feminist theory there can make it difficult to characterize. However, several notable Latin feminist theorists include Marcela Ríos Tobar, Ofelia Schutte, and Gloria Anzaldúa. Latina feminist philosopher Maria Lugones addressed ethnocentric racism, bilingualism, multiculturalism, and her concept of "address". Many Latina feminists borrow concepts that Lugones introduced, such as "the role of language, bodies, objects, and places." Graciela Hierro, born in 1928 in Mexico, addressed "feminist ethics and the roles of feminism in public and academic spaces.

== Causes ==
There is a fairly solid consensus among academics and activists that women's participation in leftist movements has been one of the central reasons for the development of Latin American feminism. However, some Latin American countries were able to attain legal rights for women in right wing, conservative contexts. Julie Shayne argues that there are five factors that contributed to the emergence of revolutionary feminism:

- experience in revolutionary movements showed a challenge to the status quo perception of gender behavior
- logistical trainings
- a political opening
- unmet basic needs by revolutionary movements
- a collective feminist consciousness

The movement developed in close connection with Anglo-American feminism, especially liberal feminism, which placed a strong emphasis on women's economic independence, political and legal equality, and bodily autonomy, including sexual and reproductive rights. However, there has been resistance to including the viewpoints of excluded groups, especially in relation to race, class, and sexuality, inside the mainstream feminist movement. A white, urban, middle-class elite has mainly ruled the feminist debate in Latin America. This elite has an obvious heterosexist bias and has ignored the experiences of lesbians and indigenous women. Indigenous feminists argue for a collective defense of indigenous women's rights as part of larger community and cultural battles, criticizing the individualistic nature of liberal feminism. Lesbian feminists, on the other hand, confront lesbophobia within the feminist movement and fight the heterosexualization of society, which they view as a tool for oppressing women. The two groups have brought up major concerns regarding liberal feminism's flaws, especially its tendency to overlook racial, class, and colonial issues.

== History and the Evolution of Feminism in Latin America ==
=== 1800s ===
Although the term feminist would not be used to describe women's rights advocates until the 1890s, many women of the nineteenth century, mostly elite or middle class, tried to challenge dominant gender norms.

During the nineteenth century, there were similar patterns across the region of informal gatherings led by women intellectuals. These helped shape early feminist knowledge and were present throughout Latin America. In Brazil, Chile, and Mexico, women writers and educators used literature and salons to challenge gender norms, even when formal political participation was denied. In Latin America, early feminist thought and expression emerged through debates on education and morality. Scholars note that these early interventions by women writers, teachers, and activists were, however, limited by class and race, as they were hosted primarily by more elite women. At this time, Indigenous and Afro-descendant women were largely excluded from these spaces but were active in resistance and labor struggles. In the region as a whole, early feminism developed unevenly following the hierarchical system shaped by a colonial past.

Manuela Sáenz was a woman born in 1797 in Quito, New Granada (Modern-Day Ecuador), who lived to be a heroine figure to many due to her involvement with Simón Bolívar as not only a supporting voice to his idea of independence but also the woman who saved him from an assassination attempt, guiding him to safety through a bedroom window. Her significance did not come immediately. Rather, it took modern-day feminist voices to bring her into the spotlight and claim that she was a feminist symbol of her time.

In addition to Sáenz, several other women actively participated on the front lines of the war effort in support of Latin American independence and women's empowerment. Micaela Bastidas, the wife of Tupac Amaru, a Peruvian indigenous revolutionary who fought against the Spanish Empire. Micaela Bastidas directly assisted in the logistics of the attempted revolution, but was later captured and tortured to death by the Spanish Empire. She remained strong-willed until the time of her death and did not release sensitive and crucial information about the attempted revolution during her imprisonment.

Juana Manuela Gorriti, an Argentinian journalist and writer born in 1818, advocated greater rights for women and wrote literary works with women protagonists that were both "romantic and political". Gorriti was a well-known organizer and host of informal gatherings in Lima and Buenos Aires. Similar to Sáenz, Gorriti held tertulias for literary men and women, one of whom was Clorinda Matto de Turner, a novelist sympathetic towards Indians and critical of the priesthood in Peru. Gorriti also worked with Teresa González, an avid writer who ran a girls' school and advocated education for women.

Flora Tristan, born in 1803 to a Frenchwoman and a Peruvian aristocrat, significantly influenced early feminism and socialism, spreading them from Latin America to Europe. Tristan was an early feminist and socialist who sought to raise awareness that working women and men were a class like any other, deserving of working rights and recognition. In Workers' Union, a book published in 1843, she attempts to introduce this notion to French workers. She advocates creating a workers' union, believing the working class needs to recognize itself as a unified social class. She also strongly argued for women's right to work and earn a fair wage, seeing economic independence as the key to women's ability to choose relationships based on love rather than being sold into marriage by their families. Although she did not live to see its success, her friend Elisa Lemonnier later carried forward this vision, establishing the first professional school for women in 1862.

While on a mission to reclaim her inheritance in 1833, Tristan also found time to write two books published in 1835 (Peregrinations of a Pariah and Of the Necessity of Welcoming Foreign Women), which documented her experiences as a woman traveling the world and highlighted the social situation of women in large cities. These books became successful, especially Peregrinations of a Pariah, which helped expose the exploitation of working women, including nuns and prostitutes, while also shedding light on the broader struggles of Black and Indigenous women in Peru. Towards the later years of her life, she dedicated herself fully to traveling to factories and holding meetings aimed at uniting workers—both men and women—to organize and emerge as a class. She eventually fell ill, likely due to continuous travel, and died in late 1844.

=== 1900s–1920s ===
Building on the groundwork of 19th-century feminist debates, the early 20th century saw three main areas of feminist discussion: suffrage, protective labor laws, and access to education. In 1910, Argentina hosted the first meeting of the International Feminist Congresses (on the topic of equality), followed by a second meeting in 1916 in Mexico.

In Uruguay and Argentina, women's groups fought for legal change and access to education. In Brazil, women organized to secure the right to vote, which was achieved in 1932. In Cuba and Puerto Rico, women came together around nationalism and labor during the independence movements. Women in this era were more visible in public and were challenging gender expectations. Their hard work built the foundation for feminist movements that followed.

In the 1910s, women such as Aleida March gained prominence during the revolutions in Mexico, Cuba, and Nicaragua. At the same time, Amelio Robles, born in 1889, served as a very respected member in a peasant army and the Confederation of Veterans of the Revolution; today he might be considered as a transgender man.

Another person of note born during this time was Gabriela Mistral, who won the Nobel Prize in Literature in 1945 and became a voice for women in Latin America. She upheld conservative gender norms, even at one point saying, "perfect patriotism in women is perfect motherhood", and that as a teacher she was "married" to the state. However, feminist theorists contend that her personal experiences contradict her language, because she never married, she had a "mannish" appearance, and her close personal relationships with women suggest that she might have been a closet lesbian.

=== 1930s–1950s ===
The Partido Nacional Revolucionario (PNR), the dominant political party in Mexico, declared on February 25, 1937, that it would permit "organized" women, who belonged to government-supporting organizations, labor unions, or agrarian leagues, to cast ballots in internal party elections. Under President Lázaro Cárdenas, this action represented a compromise. Although Cárdenas and other PNR leaders supported women's suffrage in theory, they were concerned that granting women full voting rights would lead to conservative voting trends that could cause the party to lose. The suffragists were not happy with the little progress, but this partial action allowed the PNR to seem in favor of suffrage without risking electoral consequences.

The 1930s, 1940s, and 1950s were full of Latina feminists who pioneered the current Latin American feminist movement. It was the beginning of the suffragist movement for many Latin American women. The first elected woman mayor of any major capital city in the Americas, Felisa Rincon de Gautier, was "an active participant in Puerto Rico's women's suffrage movement" that was won in 1932, and her childcare programs "inspired the United States' Head Start program." In revolutionary Mexico, politics involved complex power struggles at multiple levels. María del Refugio ‘Cuca’ García had to negotiate state and local power institutions that operated somewhat independently of Mexico City as part of her challenge to national political authority. Historian Alan Knight pointed out that despite the revolutionary government's promotion of "effective suffrage," elections frequently lacked democratic integrity, revealing an absence of an identifiable civic duty in politics during the 1930s. Although election results were rarely determined solely by the popular vote, Ben Fallaw and other academics show that elections can still be important.

Most women advocating for equal rights had to cling to femininity to gain respect. Still, feminist theorist Julia de Burgos used her writings to "openly contest the prevailing notion that womanhood and motherhood are synonymous." Additionally, Dr. Leila Gonzalez was involved in the "Brazilian Black movement" and helped develop "the practice of Black Feminism in Brazil."

The period from the 1930s to the 1950s was important for women in Latin America. During this period, many countries granted women the right to vote (Brazil, Cuba, El Salvador, Argentina, and Mexico), allowing them to take an active role in politics. However, there was still an uneven balance in equality, especially for women in rural and indigenous communities. Feminist movements grew, and some worked closely with governments, which at times resulted in limited goals. In most cases, the period saw progress and much gain, but true equity was not achieved. For example, in the Dominican Republic, Abigail Mejia and Livia Veloz founded Acción Feminista Dominicana (AFD) in 1931. AFD eventually aligned with president and dictator Rafael Trujillo to achieve their aims. Historians and feminist scholars have debated the degree to which AFD was coerced into cooperation with Trujillo. AFD feminists were given key roles as administrators and advisors in Trujillo's ruling party, particularly in social services. AFD operated eleven night schools for working class women, established a library in Santo Domingo, and distributed baby baskets to new mothers. Although winning the right to vote was one of AFD's primary goals and Trujillo agreed to a provisional vote, he delayed women's suffrage until the 1940s.

=== 1960s–1970s ===
At the end of the 1960s, many Latin American women began forming groups focused on reflection and activism to defend women's rights. Initially, those women were middle-class, and a significant portion came from various left groups. Unlike their predecessors, however, Latin American feminists of the 1960s focused on social justice rather than suffrage. They emphasized "reproductive rights, equal pay in the job market, and equality of legal rights." This Latin American feminism was a result of the activism of Latina women against their position of subordination, not a reaction to women gaining more legal rights in the United States and Europe. As Gloria Anzaldúa said, we must put history "through a sieve, winnow out the lies, look at the forces that we as a race, as women, have been part of."

Such female groups emerged amid the sharp radicalization of class struggles in the region, which led to the rise of labor and mass movements. The most evident manifestations of these were the Chilean industrial belts Cordón Industrial, the Cordobazo in Argentina (a 1969 civil uprising), student mobilizations in Mexico, and others. These facts could be regarded as the sharpest experience, and numerous urban and rural guerrilla movements came onto the scene.

For those reasons, Latin American feminist theorist Ros Tobar argues that Chilean feminism is closely tied to socialism. Authoritarian regimes reinforced "the traditional family, and the dependent role of women, which is reduced to that of mother." Because dictatorships institutionalized social inequality, many Latin American feminists tie authoritarian governments with fewer rights for women. Slogans, such as "Women give life, the dictatorships exterminate it," "In the Day of the National Protest: Let's make love not the beds," and "Feminism is Liberty, Socialism, and Much More," portrayed the demands of many Latin American feminists. Latin American feminist theorist Nelly Richard of Chile explored how feminism and gay culture broke down rigid structures of life in Chile and were essential to the liberation of women in her novel Masculine/Feminine: Practices of Difference.

Feminist meetings continued to occur, initially every two years and later every three years. Topics discussed included recent accomplishments, strategies, potential future conflicts, ways to enhance their strategies, and how, through these means, to establish varied, rich, and extensive coordination between the national and transnational levels.

However, the mid-70s saw the decline of such movements due to the region's neoliberalism policy. When dictatorial regimes took hold across most of the region, they prevented the development of feminist movements. This was due not only to the establishment of a reactionary ideology based on the defense of tradition and family, but also to the political persecution and state terrorism with its consequences such as torture, forced exile, imprisonment, disappearances, and murders of political, social, and trade union activists.

While the right wing of politicians considered feminists to be subversive and rebellious, the left, in contrast, named them the "small bourgeois".

It was also during this time that leftist feminist organizations gained attention for their efforts. This is most prominently seen in the "Women of Young Lords" of Puerto Rico. The Young Lords were, at first, Boricuan, Afro-Taino men who fought for basic human rights and "openly challenged machismo, sexism, and patriarchy." Bianca Canales, Luisa Capetillo, Connie Cruz, and Denise Oliver became leaders in the Young Lords and helped facilitate the "Ten-Point Health Program."

Most feminisms in Latin America arose out of the context of military dictatorships and masculine domination. However, many marginalized women began questioning hegemonic feminism in the 1970s. These women, whether they were Afro-descendant, lesbians, Indigenous, transgender, sex workers, domestic workers, etc., began to look at different, interlocking types of oppression. Gloria Anzaldúa, of Indigenous descent, described her experience with intersectionality as a "racial, ideological, cultural, and biological cross-pollination", and called it a "new mestiza consciousness."

Various critiques of "internal colonialism of Latin American states toward their own indigenous populations" and "Eurocentrism in the social sciences" emerged, giving rise to Latin American Feminist Theory. This was a time of strong growth is feminist activism even under very difficult political conditions. For instance, under military dictatorships, women organized around human rights causes (Argentina, Chile, and Uruguay). New and additional voices emerged, challenging older forms of feminism by emphasizing Indigenous, Afro-descendant, and working-class women. At the end of this period, feminism in Latin America had become more active and diverse; it was closely connected to struggles for justice, even though issues persisted due to political repression and ingrained inequalities.

=== 1980s ===
Feminist movements expanded across Latin America in the 1980s after the fall of dictatorships, and many countries moved towards democracy. The fight for democracy, human rights, and social justice shaped this new period. For instance, in Argentina, Mothers of the Plaza de Mayo were key in the fight for democracy and represented resistance. They protested against state violence and forced disappearances during the military dictatorship; Motherhood became a force of political resistance. These grassroots movements contributed to public policy and legal reforms.

As in Argentina, women's groups help oppose military rule in Chile and Brazil. In Peru and Colombia, women rose against state violence. All across the region, women linked women's rights to human rights, which gave them visibility and brought global support.

At the same time, feminists of the 1980s, e.g., Nancy Fraser, who was not a Latin American feminist, brought attention to violence against women; she questioned the established limits of discussion and politicized problems that had never before been politicized. Feminist movements in the region used similar approaches, expanded their audiences, and created new spaces and institutions where opposing interpretations could be developed and reach wider audiences.

During the repressive period and particularly during the early years of democracy, human rights groups played a major role in the region. These movements, organized to denounce the torture, disappearances, and crimes of the dictatorship, were headed mainly by women (mothers, grandmothers, and widows). To understand the change in the language of feminist movements, it is necessary to bear in mind two things: the first is that it was women who led revelations and subsequent struggles for the punishment of those who were responsible for state terrorism, and the second is the policy, especially of the United States, to prioritize human rights in the international agenda.

Feminists achieved their goals through political parties, international organizations, and local labor groups. Latin American feminist movements had two forms: as centers of feminist work and as part of the broad, informal, mobilized, volunteer, street feminist movement.

At the IV meeting in Mexico in 1987, a document was signed on the myths of the feminist movement impeding its development. This document has a great impact; it states that feminism has a long way to go because it is a radical transformation of society, politics, and culture.

The myths listed are:

- Feminists are not interested in power
- Feminists do politics in a different way
- All feminists are the same
- There is a natural unity in the mere fact of being women
- Feminism exists only as a policy of women towards women
- The movement is a small group
- The women's spaces ensure for themselves a positive space
- Personal is automatically political
- The consensus is democracy. This is important because each country in Latin America was able to push feminism in different ways – for example, through democracy, socialism, and even under authoritarian regimes (although this was less common).

These myths were commonly disputed at Latin American and Caribbean meetings in the 1980s called Encuentros, spaces created to "strengthen feminist networks," exchange analyses, and confront "conditions of oppression." Though the Encuentros constructed a common space, the people there made sure it was a place of political dialogue, not of a sisterhood. One of the few points of unity found during these Encuentros was the effect colonialism and globalization had on their respective countries.

By the end of this decade, Feminists were more involved in politics and influencing institutions and public policy.

=== 1990s ===
The neoliberal policies that began in the late 1980s and peaked in the region during the 1990s fragmented and privatized the feminist movement. Many women began working in multilateral organizations, financial agencies, and other institutions, serving as bridges between funding bodies and women's movements. It was around this time that many feminists, feeling discomfort with the current hegemonic feminism, began to create their own, autonomous organizations. In 1994, the Zapatista National Liberation Army (EZLN) became "a catalyst for indigenous women's organization in Mexico" and created "The Women's Revolutionary Law." Their example of indigenous feminism paved the way for other indigenous tribes, such as the Mayans, Quechuas, and Quiches. Zapatista women were publicly recognized in 1994. They are used as sources of inspiration and symbolic tools for feminists worldwide and are often cited in scholarly essays and articles. In 1993, many feminists tried to bring together these autonomous organizations to support equal rights for women in Latin America and the Caribbean, which led to the Beijing Global Conference on Women of 1995.

Scholars argue that there is a strong correlation between improvements in legal rights for Latin American women and countries' struggles for democracy. For example, because of women's active protests against President Abdala Bucaram's government, Ecuador's Constitution of 1998 saw many new legal rights for women. Full democracy without including the rights of women is not a full democracy, was the thought of the era. Peru had an authoritarian regime. Still, it had a quota requiring at least 30% of candidates in a race to be women. In Peru and Bolivia, economic policies increased inequality, prompting feminists to raise concerns and speak out. Indigenous women in Guatemala and Mexico during this time fought for land and other rights. This period had both growth and challenges as work continued in the community and on the political front.The advance of Latin American women's legal equality did not eliminate the social and economic inequality that remained. In the final decade of the 20th century, feminism in Latin America became more connected across the region and more involved in government and international groups expanded.

=== 21st Century ===
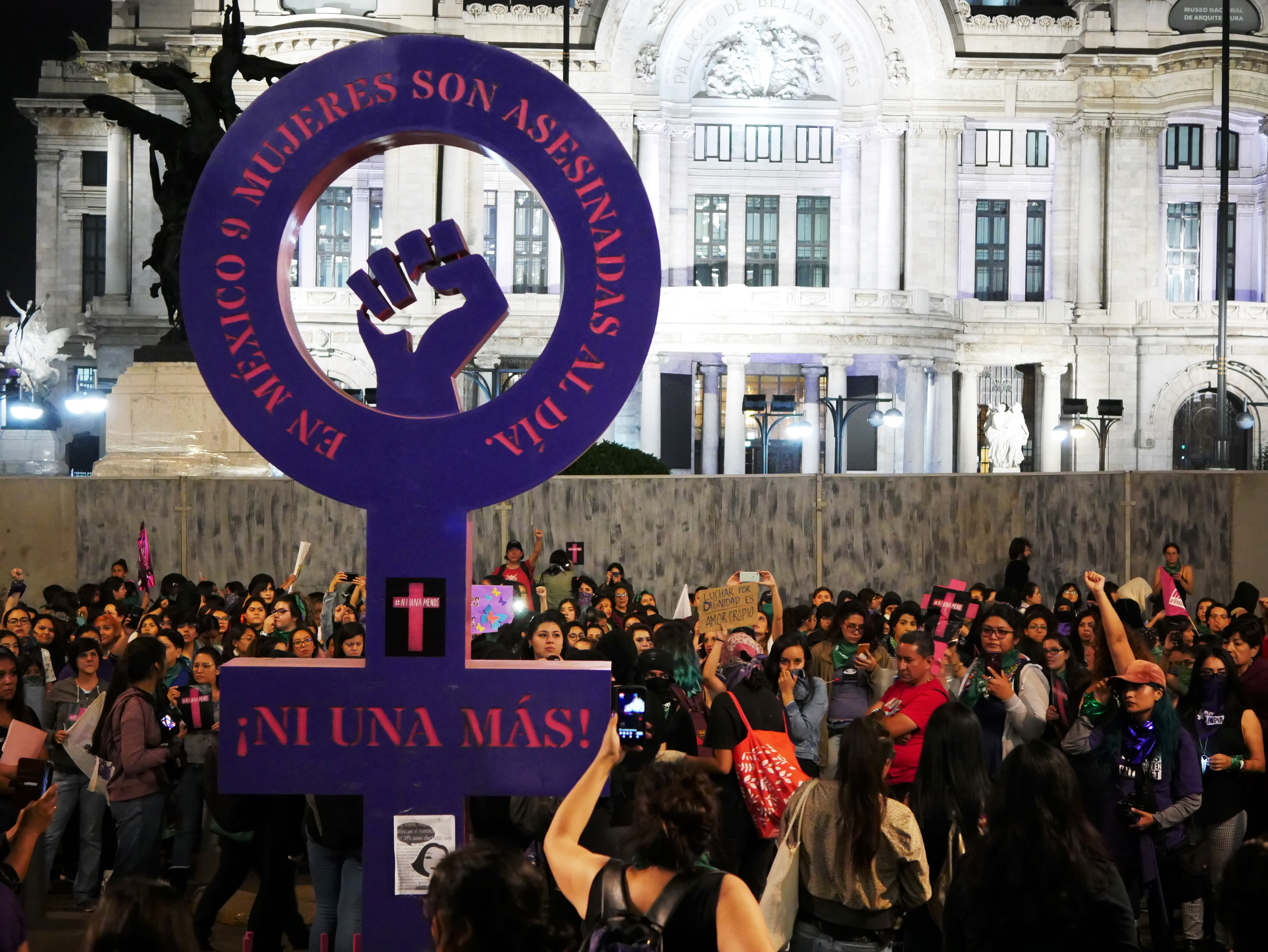
Protest on International Day for the Elimination of Violence against Women 2019 in Mexico City.

The emergence of economic neoliberal models at the beginning of the 21st century led to a global revival of the movement, accompanied by an attempt to engage in feminist dialogue with other social movements. A new feature was feminist participation in global mobilization at various government meetings and in multinational organizations, where discussions of humanity's future were high on the agenda.

With the rise of globalization and international policies, many feminist political and academic organizations became institutionalized. The more professional tactics of NGOs and political lobbying gave Latina feminists greater influence over public policy, but at the cost of "bolder, more innovative proposals from community initiatives."

Feminist movements have had a focus on violence against women and safety for women. There have been large protests, for example, Ni Una Menos, which spread across the region and was a powerful movement in Argentina against femicide and gendered violence.

Another important movement during this time was the Green Wave. It also grew across the region and supported abortion rights by campaigning, marching, and pushing for legal action.

Feminists in Latin America have sought to address the region's colonial past and have considered new feminist ideas, such as decolonial feminism. This has allowed the discussion to move toward explaining how race, class, and history affect women's lives in Latin America.

In Brazil, Colectivo Feminista Sexualidade Saude (CFSS) "provides health education for women and professionals," where they encourage self-help and focus on "women's mental health, violence against women, and child mortality."

Today, feminist groups have also spread to the United States. For example, the Latina Feminist Group, formed in the 1990s, comprises women from across Latin America. Although groups like these are local, they are all-inclusive and accept members from across Latin America. Members of the organizations are predominantly from European – Native American backgrounds, with some members being completely descendants of Native American people.

The first female mayor of Mexico City, one of the largest cities in the Western Hemisphere, was Claudia Sheinbaum Pardo, who took office in December 2018. Nearly a century after women in Latin America were granted the right to vote, this is significant in a region that continues to struggle with gender inequality. In large part due to gender quotas, nations including Bolivia, Argentina, Costa Rica, and Mexico have achieved or are on the verge of achieving gender parity in their national legislatures, reflecting an increase in women's political engagement across the region over the past 20 years. Along with Sheinbaum Pardo's election, Epsy Campbell Barr became the first female Afro-descendant vice president of Costa Rica in May 2018.

Legalizing abortion and preventing violence against women are two issues that are at the heart of the current Latin American feminist movement. As a powerful response to gender-based violence, the Ni Una Menos campaign has grown to represent a larger fight for women's rights across the area. This is a social movement that emerged as a response to violence against women in Latin America. It has evolved to encompass and incorporate the fight for other rights as well.

Today, feminist movements continue on the journey started in previous centuries. They continue to push for equal rights, better political representation, and an end to gender based violence in the region.

LGBTQ+ Movements in Latin America and Feminism in Latin America

The relationship between LGBTQ+ movements and the feminist movement in Latin America has grown closer, and in many instances, they have worked together to expand rights. During the 1960s, lesbians became a visible group in Latin America. They established groups to fight misogynist oppression against their community, fight AIDS in the LGBTQ+ community, and support one another. During the periods of military coups and dictatorships in Latin America, feminist lesbian groups had to break up, reinvent, and reconstruct their work. Dictatorships in the 1970s and 1980s in Chile and Argentina were examples of the resistance to these feminist lesbian groups in Latin America.

In the 2000s, Latin American feminist groups set goals for their communities. Such goals call for the consolidation of a more organized LGBTQ+ community across Latin America. Other goals overall look to change smaller domestic policies that in any way discriminate against members of the LGBTQ+ community. They also aim to have more people in office and to network better with the broader Latin community. They have set goals to advocate for LGBTQ+ rights in the political world, from organizations and political groups, to acknowledge their rights, and encourage other countries to protect feminists and other members of the LGBTQ+ community in Latin America. Leaders such as Rafael de la Dehesa have contributed to the description of early LGBT relations in parts of Latin America through their writings and advocacy. De la Dehesa, a Harvard alumnus, has published books such as Queering the Public Sphere in Mexico and Brazil: Sexual Rights Movements in Emerging Democracies that advocate for a shift in popular culture that accepts queer Latinos. His work, Global Communities and Hybrid Cultures: Early Gay and Lesbian Electoral Activism in Brazil and Mexico, examines gay communities and situates them within the histories of Brazil and Mexico. Rafael has also introduced the idea of normalizing LGBTQ+ issues in patriarchal conservative societies such as Mexico and Brazil to suggest that being gay should no longer be considered taboo in the early 2000s.

LGBTQ+ activists and feminist activists have worked together and shared ideas on issues of human rights and democratic citizenship. These two groups have worked together on campaigns and used similar formats to demand change. Many leaders of these campaigns identify as feminist lesbians. There has been ongoing collaboration in the fight for equity and social justice in the 21st century.

== Indigenous Feminism in Latin America ==
Indigenous Latin American feminists face a myriad of struggles, including little to no political representation across all of Latin America. It was not until the 2000s that indigenous feminist leaders were able to gain any political power. In 2006, Bolivia elected Evo Morales for president, who spearheaded a new Bolivian movement called the Movement for Socialism. This movement allowed Indigenous working-class women to become members of parliament as well as serve in other branches of the government. Though this important transition of power was more peaceful and much more inclusive than in any other country in Latin America, in other countries, obstacles remain for indigenous women to have any representation or political identity. The Mayan women who live in Guatemala and parts of southern Mexico, for example, have struggled to gain any political mobility over the last few years due to immigration crises, and economic and educational disadvantages.

Despite growing political representation, Indigenous Latin American feminists continue to face struggles within the cultural and social sectors of society, but they continue to fight. This has limited their participation in public life. Indigenous feminism has grown and is an important piece of the puzzle of Latin American Feminism as a whole. It, however, still faces many challenges. There is still work to be done in many places, for example, poverty still plagues Indigenous women in Guatemala, Mexico, and other countries throughout the region. Mayan women still face limitations due to poverty, migration, and limited access to education. Many researchers have stated that gender, race, and class inequality working together have affected indigenous women.

== Revolutionary/Feminist Mobilization ==
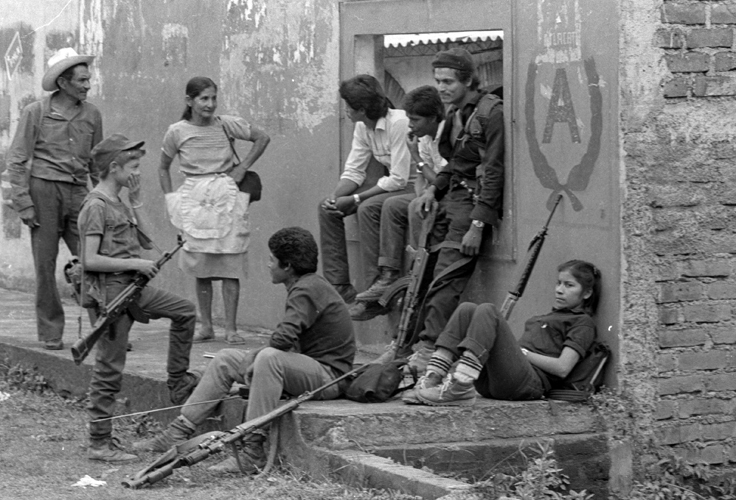
Men and Women both participated in revolutions that presented Revolutionary Feminism. These soldiers are fighting in the civil war in El Salvador.

Some experts, such as Julie Shayne, believe that in Latin America, the phenomenon of female feminist movements should be called revolutionary feminism. Julie Shayne argues that a revolutionary feminism is one born of revolutionary mobilization.

As Shayne was researching this phenomenon in El Salvador during the 1980s, she came across Lety Mendez, a former member and head of the women's secretariat of the Frente Farabundo Martí para la Liberación Nacional, one of El Salvador's major political parties. Mendez was at the forefront of the Salvadoran Civil War, and she knew from direct experience how necessary women are to any revolution. However, she also believed their role is often forgotten. Mendez explained that women were one of the few reasons the left had support and were able to move through El Salvador.

In the late 1990s, Shayne traveled to Cuba and interviewed Maria Antonia Figuero, who had worked alongside Castro during the dictatorship of Fulgencio Batista. Figueroa also described women essentially carrying a revolution on their backs, yet being undermined in the roles they played, or unable to progress past machismo and sexism, both of which were still rampant after their respective revolutions.

Both of these women's feminist ideologies were born out of the need for equality they saw was either not being met or being disregarded after their countries' successful or attempted revolutions. This feminism, born out of the fight against oppressive regimes, has given way to a new look of feminism that can be found throughout Latin America.

Feminist mobilization or gathering can be seen in Shaye's research on Chilean women and their nation's government-organized mothers' center. She witnessed that the gathering of these women and the sharing of their stories of oppression and domestic violence led the way to "Strategic (feminist) mobilization". These gatherings were not unique to Chile, but were found throughout Latin America - Bogotá, Colombia (1981), Lima, Perú (1983), Bertioga, Brazil (1985), Taxco, Mexico (1987), and San Bernardo, Argentina (1990) - through the 1980s known as Encuentros. These biannual meetings brought together grassroots and professional feminists and allowed these women to discuss their experiences and the progression of their countries.

== Feminism in revolutions ==
Feminism has been seen throughout history. It has appeared centrally during revolutionary periods. In the Mexican Revolution, the idea emerged as a political force and a social movement. It was driven by the women directly involved in the conflict. Women often took on traditional roles as nurses, cooks, messengers, and sometimes armed fighters. Women also participated in leadership roles or were directly involved in combat. Also during this time, upper-class or elite standing women were advocating for reforms in education, labor rights and political participation. This source of activism connected the nation with the struggling fight for gender equality.

Feminism was also seen in the Cuban Revolution. As in the Mexican Revolution, women also played an important role as fighters and activists. Their efforts helped shape conversations about gender equality, which were a major topic during the revolution. Although before the revolution in 1959, women had limited education opportunities and faced discrimination in the workplace. The revolutionary movement uprooted these ideals by including women in activism, healthcare, and education. After the Revolution, Castro's government tried to keep women's liberation movements going. They created the Federation of Cuban Women, which promoted literacy, childcare programs, and political training. The government's movement did improve women's access to public life, but did not undo cultural expectations of women.

== Issues on Agenda ==
Post-suffrage feminism in Latin America covers mainly three big streams: the feminist stream, the stream in political parties, and the stream of women from political parties. Some issues of great concern include: voluntary maternity/responsible paternity, divorce law reform, equal pay, personal autonomy, challenging the consistently negative and sexist portrayal of women in the media, and access to formal political representation. Women of the popular classes tend to focus their agendas on issues of economic survival and racial and ethnic justice.

In recent years, Latin American feminists have also challenged Eurocentric feminist frameworks, promoted literature and art by women of color, and established their own social groups. They have also sought to challenge traditional nationalists who oppress women and use their political influence to subjugate non-heterosexuals, women, and people of color.

== Latina Suffragists ==
Understanding Latin America's journey toward gender equality and its contributions to the global feminist movement requires examining the history of Latina suffragists and their involvement in the fight for women's rights in the region. Throughout the early to mid-20th century, Latin American women addressed both local and global issues while building transnational coalitions in their fight for the right to vote and other political rights. This act, which often addressed the political realities of American imperialism and colonial legacies, was not only about securing the right to vote but also about broader social and economic rights.

Many Latin American nations had allowed women to vote by the middle of the 20th century, but this came about after long and hard battles. Organizing for the right to vote took decades for activists in nations such as Argentina and Mexico. For example, nationalist President Lázaro Cárdenas of Mexico supported women's suffrage on the grounds of equality, and it was almost accomplished in 1939. But suffrage was not granted until 1953 due to resistance from wealthy organizations and concerns about Catholic women's conservative voting habits. In an attempt to appear more modern, the government of President Juan Perón of Argentina gave women the right to vote in 1947. This was in line with similar actions taken in Brazil and Chile, where women were granted the right to vote later in the 1940s.

Latina suffragists were innovative women who laid the foundation for the diverse, intersectional activism that Latin American feminists continue to engage in today. Following their success in gaining the right to vote, Latina activists widened their focus to include a greater variety of social and economic inequalities, such as opposing U.S. interventionism and promoting the rights of marginalized women, Indigenous peoples, and LGBTQ+ people. Through campaigns like #niunamas and #niunamenos, which have inspired Latin American feminists at both local and international levels, their impact set the groundwork for ongoing feminist movements that today address pressing issues like feminicide and violence against women.

Latina suffragists refer to suffrage activists of Latin American origin who advocated for women's right to vote.

=== Prominent Latina Suffragists ===
One of the most notable Latina suffragists is Adelina Otero-Warren from New Mexico. Otero-Warren was a prominent local organizer for the Congressional Union for Woman Suffrage organized by Alice Paul. Paul chose her to organize suffragists for the Congressional Union in 1917.

Other prominent Latina suffragists include:

- Josefina Fierro de Bright was an activist in the Latin American Community. In 1972, she was a vital part of the Citizens Committee for the Defense of Mexican American Youth, which later became known as the Sleepy Lagoon Defense Committee. The committee was formed after the murder at Sleepy Lagoon with the intention that the Mexican American defendants on trial would receive justice under the Constitution; without Josefina Fierro de Bright, it would not have been possible. She owned and invested in several businesses that led to a vast network of powerful, prominent people, including bankers and financial institutions. When funding was needed to defend the Mexican American defendants during the Sleepy Lagoon trial, Josefina Fierro de Bright would use her various connections to obtain the funds. Josefina Fierro de Bright was also an activist for labor rights and a secretary of the National Congress of Spanish-Speaking Peoples. The committee examined minority labor groups that endured unfair conditions and were prohibited from joining labor unions during the Great depression. She was the executive secretary for El Congreso for a short period of time and was known for the protests that she held for discrimination. These protests help develop awareness of the multiple types of discrimination that Latina women were experiencing within the labor force.
- Luisa Moreno was a social activist who fought for equality for women. She was from Guatemala and was previously known as Blanca Rosa Rodriguez Lopez, however, to disguise her wealthy upbringing, she changed her name when she immigrated to the United States. Luisa Moreno first began her activism in America as a trade union organizer. She was able to obtain contract coverings for 13,000 cigar workers. This ability aided Luisa Moreno's journey to being the first female vice president of the United Cannery, Agricultural, Packing, and Allied Workers of America (UCAPAWA). Luisa Moreno was able to advocate for feminism in the workplace, which led to maternity leave, child care, and equal pay. Luisa Moreno was the first person to initiate the first U.S. pan-Latino civil rights conference and was pivotal in El Congreso as an accomplished union organizer, where her leadership helped network a national assembly. Luisa Moreno was additionally recognized for her advocacy of education across classes. She felt education was the way to emancipate women from ignorance, and feminism would aid women in being mindful of their surroundings.
- Maria Amparo Ruiz de Burton
- Maria Guadalupe Evangelina de Lopez, President of the College Equal Suffrage League. Maria G.E. de Lopez was president of this league when women won the right to vote in California in 1911. She was a high school teacher and was the first person in the state of California to give speeches in support of women's suffrage in Spanish.

== See also ==
- Feminism in Argentina
- Feminism in Brazil
- Feminism in Chile
- Feminism in Honduras
- Feminism in Mexico
- Feminism in Paraguay
