= Jesús Colón =

Puerto Rican politician and writer

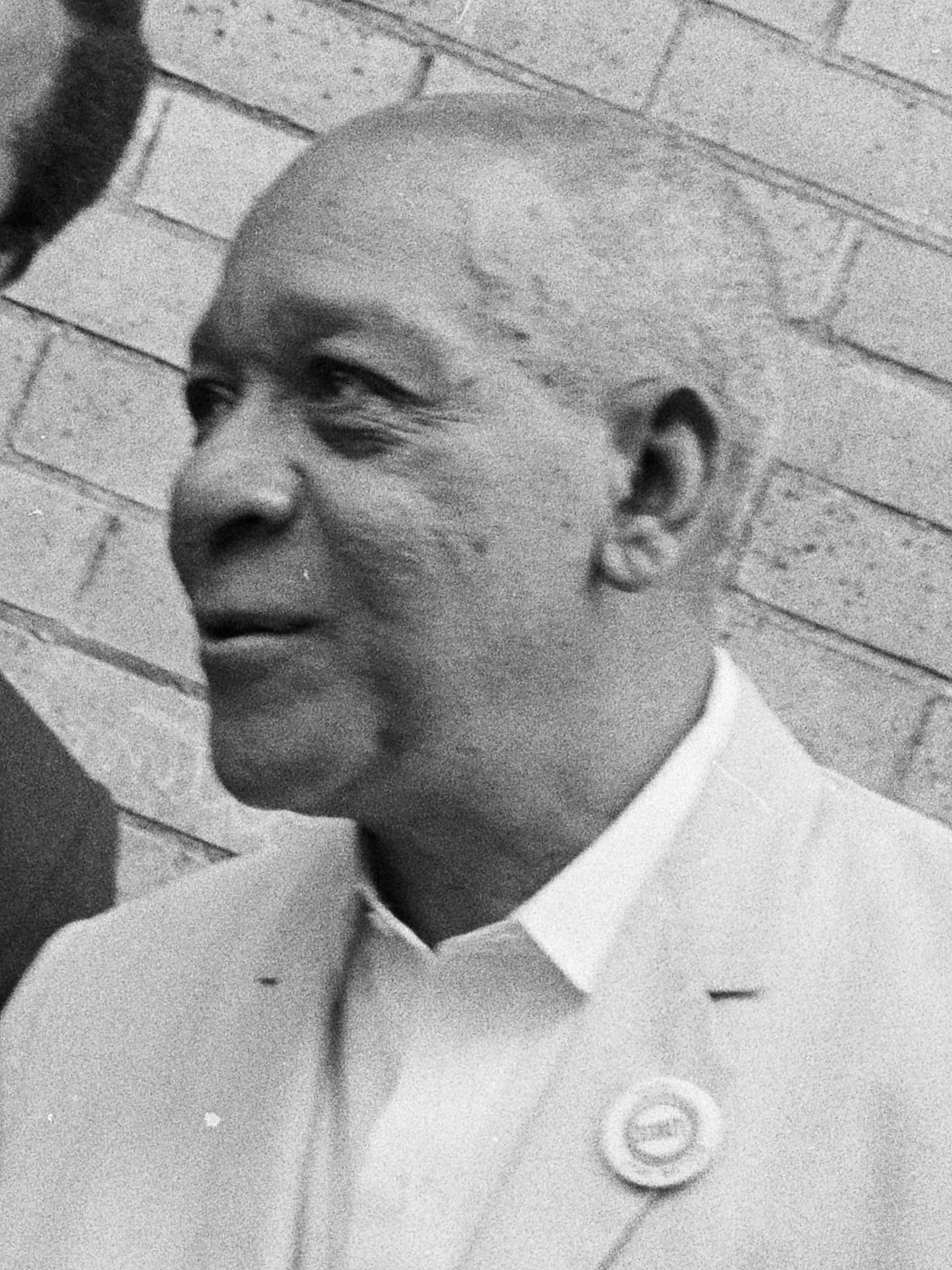
- Colón in 1969
- Born: January 20, 1901; Cayey, Puerto Rico, U.S.
- Died: May 14, 1974 (aged 73); New York City, New York, U.S.
- Writing career
- Movement: Nuyorican

Jesús Colón (1901–1974) was a Puerto Rican writer known as the Father of the Nuyorican movement. An activist and community organizer, Colón wrote poetry and stories about his experiences as an Afro-Puerto Rican living in New York.

== Early years ==
Colón was born on January 20, 1901, in Cayey, Puerto Rico, after the Spanish–American War when the American Tobacco Company gained control of most of the tobacco producing land in Puerto Rico. His parents were Mauricio Colón, his father, and Paula Lopez Cedeño, his mother. His father was a baker and his family owned the "Colon Hotel". His home was behind the town's cigar factory, which hired "readers" to read stories and current events to the employees whilst they worked. As a child, Colón visited the factory to listen to these stories. He was exposed to the writings of Karl Marx and Émile Zola, as well as literary classics like Miguel de Cervantes’ novel Don Quixote. From these ideas he formed a personal socialist ideology and also an interest in both the spoken and written word. The family moved to San Juan where he attended and continued his education at the José Julián Acosta School.

When he was a teenager while in San Juan, Colón, alongside his brother Joaquin, attended the Central Grammar High School where he participated in different organizations, such as his school's journal "Adelante" for which he was the director. He was also the President of the literary society of the school, titled the Manuel Fernández Juncos literary society. He was also an active member of the Socialist Party while in high school.

== Acclimating to New York City ==
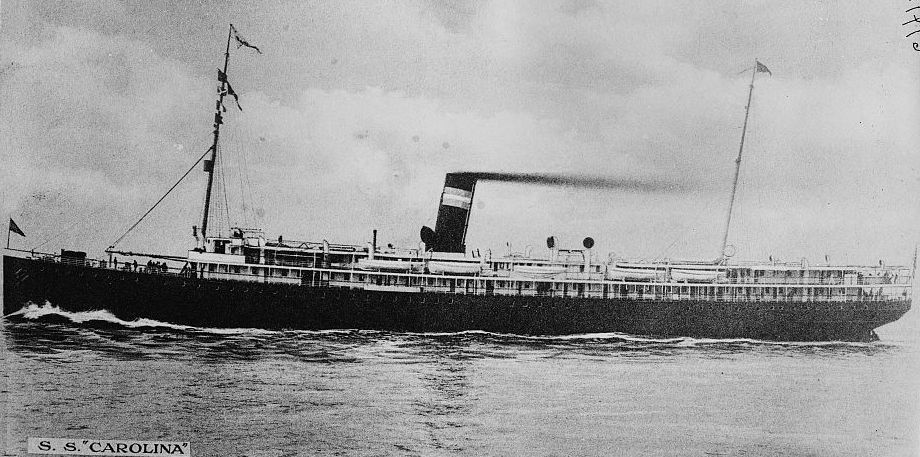
SS Carolina

In 1917, when he was 16, Colón boarded the SS Carolina as a stowaway, hiding in a linen closet to secure passage. During the trip, a member of the crew found him and he was required to work in the ship's kitchen as an employee. Because of his hard work, the captain of the ship offered him a job to stay aboard the ship and earn 30 dollars a day. He did not accept the job and when the ship docked in Brooklyn, New York, in 1918, he never returned to the ship.

Without much money, and not even a high school degree, Colón went to live with his older brother, Joaquín Colón-López, who was already residing in Brooklyn. He worked in various unskilled jobs, such as in different factories, as a dishwasher and waiter, as a postal clerk, and as a dockworker. As a result, he was able to observe the deplorable conditions of the working class of the time.

When Colón arrived in New York, he often wrote letters to his fiancée Rufa "Concha" Concepción Fernández, who remained in Puerto Rico. Seven years after Colón arrived, Concha made her way to New York on January 29, 1925, and reunited with Colón. The two were subsequently married on December 31, 1925, and resided in Brooklyn. When Colón became politically active, she acted as his secretary. She then became politically active and assisted in the founding of various community organizations. According to The Colón Papers, she became the secretary of "la Liga Puertorriqueña e Hispana" (The Puerto Rican and Hispanic League), which fostered mutual aid in the collective struggle and solidarity with all Hispanics in New York City. Her work contributed to the growth and acculturation of the New York Puerto Rican community. During their marriage, Concha would travel to Puerto Rico while Colón remained in New York, and the two often communicated through letters. They were married for 32 years.

Colón detailed many of his experiences navigating New York City in his writings. In a series titled "A memo for series of articles on Puerto Ricans in NYC," Colón wrote about a broad array of social issues, such as police brutality, housing issues, economic issues, and politics in the city. He also talked about the racial relations that manifested in New York, with Puerto Ricans coming into contact with African Americans.

In addition, Colón became an active member of his New York community. He served as a member of the New York Committee of the Puerto Rican Socialist Party of which he helped to establish. This committee was not the only socialist party that Colón was involved in, as he would go on to help create other organizations such as the Puerto Rican organization Alianza Obrera Puertorriqueña created in 1923. Colón sought to defend Puerto Rican workers and help them in their efforts to unionize for better conditions. In 1926, he helped to found the organization Ateneo Obrero Hispano which sought to promote cultural and educational growth.

== Nuyorican Movement ==
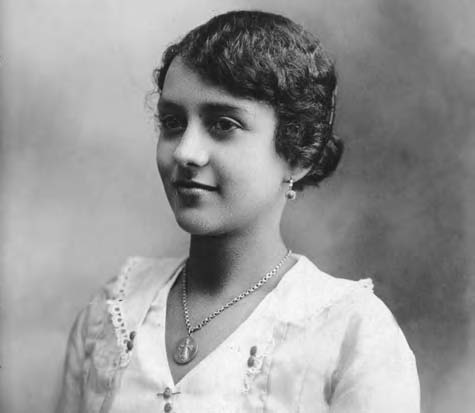
Jesus Colón's wife, community organizer Rufa Concepción Fernández “Concha” Colón (1903–1958), in 1925

Colón was discriminated against because of the color of his skin (he was of African descent) and because of his difficulty speaking the English language. He wrote about his experiences, as well as the experiences of other immigrants, becoming among the first Puerto Ricans to do so in English. His best known work, A Puerto Rican in New York, set the stage for the literary movement known as the "Nuyorican movement". Colón inspired other writers such as Piri Thomas, Esmeralda Santiago, Nicholasa Mohr, Pedro Pietri, and others.

Colón, in addition to the organizations he founded and served with, sought to write in various newspapers to project his political and personal thoughts. He also utilized pseudonyms while writing, going by the names Miquis Tiquis and Pericles Espada.

Colón began a Spanish language newspaper, and he would go on to write in both Spanish and English papers throughout his career. In 1927, he joined the editorial board of the New York City-based newspaper Gráfico (a newspaper edited by Bernardo Vega that featured writing by Cuban, Puerto Rican and other Latina/o migrants living in New York City). Gráfico was one of the Spanish-language newspapers he wrote for, and he wrote for it during the 1920s as a contributing columnist. Other Spanish-language papers that Colón wrote for include the papers Liberación and Pueblos Hispanos, both for which he wrote for during the 1940s. He also wrote for La Vida Obrera, a publication of the communist-aligned Centro Obrero de Habla Española.

One of the English-language papers that Colón wrote for was the communist press. In 1955, he wrote a regular column for the Daily Worker, another English-language paper. The Daily Worker was a publication of the Communist Party in New York. Colón titled his weekly column "As I See It From Here," which appeared in the Daily Worker for two years; after 1957, the column moved to the newspaper titled Worker (a weekly version of the Daily Worker) for 10 years. Other publications that Colón contributed to include the Daily World, as a writer, and Mainstream, as an editor. Colón was also the president of "Hispanic Publications" which published history books, political pamphlets in Spanish, and literature.

In 1933, Colón decided to officially join the Communist Party USA, remaining part of the organization until his death. In the 1940s, Colón was president of the Cervantes Fraternal Society, the Spanish language division of the pro-Communist International Workers Order (IWO), a non-profit fraternal organization (life & health insurance, social and cultural activities, etc.) made up of 16 ethnic/language groupings that, in total at its height, counted almost 200,000 members. (The Cervantes Fraternal Society, IWO, should not be confused with the Cervantes Society of America, an academic group.) The IWO, after being included on the U. S. Attorney General's list of "subversive organizations" (the listing was overturned by the U.S. Supreme Court), was dissolved by the NY State Supreme Court in 1951.

In the 1950s, during the McCarthy period, Colón was called to testify in front of the House Un-American Activities Committee in Washington, D.C. He outraged the Committee when he stated "I will not cooperate with this committee in its aim to destroy the Bill of Rights and other Constitutional rights of the people".

== Later years ==
In 1969, Colón ran for the "Office of Comptroller of the City of New York", running with Rasheed Storey, candidate for mayor on the Communist Party ticket. Neither candidate won.

Jesús Colón died in New York City on May 14, 1974. In accordance with his wishes, his body was cremated, returned to Puerto Rico and scattered over the Río de la Plata, in Cayey; from there the river goes north and into the Atlantic Ocean.

Edna Acosta-Belén, professor of Latin American and Caribbean Studies at the University of Albany and Virginia Sanchez Korrol, associate professor and Chair of the Department of Puerto Rican Studies at Brooklyn College, put together a booklet of Colón's writings called "The Way it was and Other Writings". Jesús Colón's niece (daughter of Joaquin), Olimpia Colón Aponte, is a retired writer who lives in Puerto Rico.

The Jesús Colón Papers, 1901-1974, the literary papers of Jesús Colón are held at the Archives of the Puerto Rican Diaspora Centro de Estudios Puertorriqueños Hunter College, CUNY. The collection consists of "letters, notes, drafts of published and unpublished works, reports, clippings, and photographs with a majority of the papers consisting of organizational records such as by-laws, minutes, membership lists, programs, and policy statements."

== Literary themes ==
Colón, in addition to writing for different newspapers and working for community organizations, also had different literary publications. In 1961 he published A Puerto Rican in New York, and other sketches, containing various vignettes about his life. He also had two posthumous collections, titled Lo que el pueblo me dice--: crónicas de la colonia puertorriqueña en Nueva York and The way it was, and other writings: historical vignettes about the New York Puerto Rican community. In addition to these works, there is also The Jesús Colón Papers. Many of the themes that Colón wrote about in his various newspaper columns also appeared in his literature.

One theme that Colón often wrote about included the topic of race and, in particular, his own racial experience of being African-American. In one poem, titled "Black is Beautiful," written in Spanish, Colón writes about his race as being beautiful. In one Vignette from A Puerto Rican in New York, and other sketches titled "The Mother, the Young Daughter, Myself, and All of Us," Colón writes about being called a racial slur by a young white girl, despite Colón having never spoken a word to her.

Another theme that appears in Colón's literature is related to the struggle of the lower classes. In a poem from The Jesús Colón Papers titled "Acrostico," Colón writes about those who are forced to work every day and compares them to slaves. Colón also wrote about class struggles in a vignette titled "Two Men With But One Pair of Pants," as Colón detailed how he used to share a pair of work pants with his brother, Joaquin. After Colón arrived in New York, the two brothers, despite both having a job, could not afford to pay for another pair of pants. As a result, they would share the pants together. It was not until a man gave Colón 10 dollars that the two were able to have their own pair of pants.

== Written works ==
Posthumous compilations

- Lo que el pueblo me dice--: crónicas de la colonia puertorriqueña en Nueva York, edited and with an introduction by Edwin Karli Padilla Aponte, 2001. Houston, Texas: Arte Público Press. ISBN 1-55885-330-8.
- The way it was, and other writings: historical vignettes about the New York Puerto Rican community. edited with an introductory essay by Edna Acosta-Belén and Virginia Sánchez Korrol, 1993. Houston: Arte Público Press. ISBN 1-55885-057-0.

Contemporary publications

- A Puerto Rican in New York, and other sketches, 1961. New York: Mainstream Publishers.

=== Anthologies ===
- "Kipling and I" (poem), in Wáchale!: poetry and prose about growing up Latino in America, edited by Ilan Stavans, 2001. Chicago: Cricket Books. ISBN 0-8126-4750-5.
- "The teacher was surprised", in Riding low on the street of gold, edited and with an introduction by Judith Ortiz Cofer, 2003. Houston, Texas: Piñata Books; Arte Público Press.
- "For the Color of My Mother", in Hispanic American literature: an anthology, compiled by Rodolfo Cortina, 1998. Lincolnwood, Illinois : NTC Pub. Group. ISBN 0-8442-5730-3.
- "from A Perfect Silence", in Growing up Puerto Rican: an anthology, edited and with an introduction by Joy L. De Jesʹus; foreword by Ed Vega, 1997. New York: William Morrow. ISBN 0-688-13740-7.
- "Island of Lost Causes" and "The Docile Puerto Rican: Literature and Psychological Reality" in Boricuas: influential Puerto Rican writings – an anthology, edited by Roberto Santiago, 1995. New York: Ballantine Books. ISBN 0-345-39502-6.

== See also ==
- List of Puerto Rican writers
- List of Puerto Ricans
- Puerto Rican literature
