= Petronila Angélica Gómez =

Dominican teacher and feminist (1883–1971)

- Born: 31 January 1883; Santo Domingo, Dominican Republic
- Died: 1 September 1971 (aged 88); Santo Domingo, Dominican Republic
- Other names: Petronila Angélica Gómez de Saldaña
- Occupations: educator, feminist, writer
- Years active: 1908–1952

Petronila Angélica Gómez (31 January 1883 – 1 September 1971) was a teacher, entrepreneur and journalist from the Dominican Republic, who established the first feminist organization and first feminist magazine in the country, as a means to protest the United States occupation of her homeland. She developed networks with international feminist organizations and actively sought an increased role for women in society and eventually women's suffrage. Soon after women attained the vote, she lost her vision and retired from public activity, though she published two books after going blind. She is remembered as a pioneering feminist and has been recognized by a street and meeting hall which bear her name.

== Early life ==
Petronila Angélica Gómez was born on 31 January 1883 in Santo Domingo, Dominican Republic to Raimunda (née Brea) and Eustaquio Gómez. She had one brother, Tomás, and was raised in impoverished conditions in her black Dominican family. She attended the elementary school run by Doña Teresa Rodríguez and the Normal School of Santo Domingo, before moving to San Pedro de Macorís in 1908, to direct the Escuela Mixta (Coeducational School) there. San Pedro de Macorís was the center of the sugar industry on the island, as well as the focal point for liberal intellectualism. She continued her education while teaching graduating with an instructor's certificate in 1911 and a teaching certification in 1915. The year after Gómez earned her teaching degree, the United States invaded the Dominican Republic. The occupation, which lasted until 1924, and Gómez's opposition to it, was the stimulus which caused the emergence of the feminist movement in the Dominican Republic.

== Career ==
In 1919, Gómez left the Escuela Mixta, having purchased the Amiama Gómez Kindergarten, which had previously been operated by Mercedes Amiama Gómez and her daughters Aurora and Josefa. She would serve as administrator of the school through the 1930s, while simultaneously teaching at the Night School for Domestic Workers and Laborers. In 1920, Gómez joined the Dominican National Union (es) upon its founding to protest the U.S. intervention in the country and campaign for the troops to leave immediately. Laws were implemented to impose censorship and limit free expression of intellectuals and opposition, leading to the arrest in 1921 of Fabio Fiallo and Américo Lugo, among others. Believing that women were essential for the moral regeneration of the country, she saw the fight for Dominican sovereignty as one which required women to actively work to rebuild the society. To that end, on 15 July 1922 she founded the first feminist journal of the country. Fémina was a magazine written by and for women, to exchange their ideas and discuss the needs and problems they faced. Gómez served as the administrator and editor-in-chief of the journal, with Laura Herrera de Geraldino and Consuelo Montalvo de Frías collaborating on articles. Initially, the magazine appeared bi-weekly and carried patriotic and nationalist themes.

In April 1923, at the invitation of Elena Arizmendi Mejia, founder of the International League of Iberian and Latin American Women, Gómez founded the first feminist organization in the Dominican Republic, the Central Dominican Feminist Committee (Spanish: Comité Central Feminista Dominicano (CCFD)), as a branch of the international organization. The purpose of the organization, like that of the magazine, was to spurn the vision of American feminists and suffragists, promoting a Pan-Hispanic feminism that addressed the values that were important to Latina feminists. Uniting female and male intellectuals, race became the unifying factor, to propel women forward as moral compasses guiding the home and nation. The organization excluded those who were uneducated, though simultaneously pressed for better educational opportunities for women, seeing education as a means to make women better mothers and more able to propel the country in a moral direction. In 1931 Dominican Feminist Action (Spanish: Acción Feminista Dominicana (AFD)) was founded by members of the social club Nosotras and within two years, became the dominant feminist organization, forcing CCFD to dissolve.

By 1925, Fémina's editorial staff had expanded to include Mignon Coiscou de González, Isabel Pellerano, Carmen G. de Peynado, Beatriz Lucila Simó, and Delia Weber, as well as correspondents like Ana Jiménez, Abigail Mejia, Ana Teresa Paradas, Evangelina Rodríguez. Though directing the magazine, Gómez also wrote articles, sometimes using the pseudonym Bisfalia. In 1927, Fémina became a monthly journal, but for a brief period between 1929 and 1930, the format went back to bi-monthly, when finances due to the Great Depression were scarce. After the Americans departed from the country, the journal focused more on building international connections of women throughout Latin America and the Caribbean. She devoted space to publishing ideas of other feminists and wrote many articles on the Pan-American conferences, as well as the Inter-American Commission of Women and its leadership. With the election of Rafael Trujillo as President of the Dominican Republic influences in women's groups shifted to those who supported his regime and by 1932, Gómez was the sole editor of Fémina. Whereas she saw In 1934, she moved back to Santo Domingo and articles after that time focused much more on social issues like charitable works, education, home economics, law and women's medical issues.

Gómez married the writer José Altagracia Saldaña Suazo on 4 February 1939 and though she published a few articles as Petronila Angélica Gómez de Saldaña, Fémina stopped publication that year. An increasing bent toward anti-Haitianism and Negrophobia had begun to push the country toward an institutionally ingrained favoritism for white and Hispanic identity. Though women gained suffrage in 1942 in the Dominican Republic and Gómez voted in the election, soon thereafter she withdrew from political activity. By 1948, she had become completely blind, but wrote and published two books, Influencia de la mujer en Iberoamérica (Influence of women in Latin America, 1948) and Contribución a la historia del feminismo dominicano (Contribution to the History of Dominican Feminism, 1952), before withdrawing from public life.

== Death and legacy ==
Gómez spent her final years in an assisted living facility, Geriatric Home San Francisco de Asís, in Santo Domingo, where she died in obscurity on 1 September 1971. In 1977, a proposal to honor her memory with a street named after her was defeated. In 1990, the writer and historian, Julio Jaime Julia, profiled her in his book Haz de luces, which highlighted the contributions of outstanding Dominican women. Though the General Archive of the Nation contain almost a complete collection of Fémina, her contributions were little recognized in the country until 2003, when in recognition of International Women's Day, the name of Calle 25 Oeste was changed to bear her name, as was the meeting hall in the Women's Ministry headquarters. International scholars have restored her place as one of the formative group of feminists in the Dominican Republic and highlighted her founding role in the feminist movement of the country.
