= Delia Weber =

Dominican teacher, artist, poet and film actress (1900–1982)

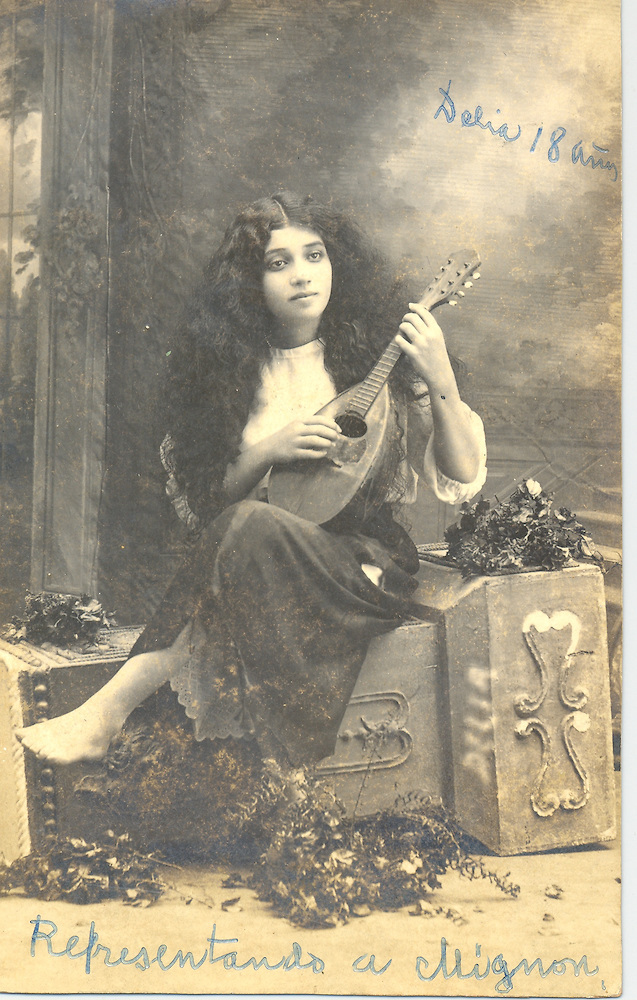
- 1918 photograph by Abelardo Rodríguez Urdaneta
- Born: Delia Mercedes Weber Pérez; 23 October 1900; Santo Domingo, Dominican Republic
- Died: 28 December 1982 (aged 82); Santo Domingo, Dominican Republic
- Other name: Delia Weber de Coiscou
- Occupations: educator, women's rights activist, poet, writer and painter
- Years active: 1918–1980

Delia Mercedes Weber Pérez (known as Delia Weber; 23 October 1900 – 28 December 1982) was a Dominican teacher, artist, poet and film actress, as well as a feminist and supporter of women's suffrage. Through her writing and painting, she portrayed the world in which she lived and the restrictions placed upon her life. Founding several cultural and feminist clubs, Weber successfully navigated the Trujillo years, helping to gain both civil and political rights for women.

== Early life ==
Delia Mercedes Weber Pérez was born on 23 October 1900 in the Santa Bárbara neighborhood of Santo Domingo, the Dominican Republic to Dominican, Enriqueta Pérez and Curaçaoan, Juan Esteban Weber Sulié (also known as Johann Stephan Weber). Her father was a goldsmith who had immigrated to the Dominican Republic from Curaçao. Her paternal grandfather, Alfred von Weber, whose ancestry traced to Dresden, was a musician who had immigrated from Amsterdam to the Caribbean and married Pauline Sulié, a native Curaçaoan woman. When she was twelve years old, Weber entered the Liceo Núñez de Cáceres, graduating from her higher primary studies in 1914. She began studying art in 1917, at the Academia de Dibujo, Pintura y Escultura (Academy of Drawing, Painting and Sculpture), under the tutelage of Abelardo Rodríguez Urdaneta and the following year entered the Instituto de Señoritas "Salomé Ureña". She would graduate from this school with a bachelor's degree in natural sciences and later complete the institution's normal school. She also studied art with Adolfo Obregón and Celeste Woss y Gil

== Career ==
In 1918, Weber began publishing poems in the magazine, Fémina and soon began serving on the editorial board of the paper, the first feminist newspaper in the country directed by Petronila Angélica Gómez. When she finished her education, Weber began teaching art at various schools in Santo Domingo including, the Escuela Normal de Varones de Santo Domingo, the Instituto de Señoritas Salomé Ureña, and the Liceo Juan Pablo Duarte. In 1923, she joined the first feminist organization in the country, also founded by Gómez, Central Committee of Dominican Feminists (Spanish: Comité Central Feminista Dominicano (CCFD)), the local arm of the International League of Iberian and Latin American Women (Spanish: La Liga Internacional de Mujeres Ibéricas e Hispanoamericanas). These early feminist groups were part of the nationalist movement in opposition to the U.S. occupation. Weber wrote articles which were published in Democracia of Puerto Rico, El Ateneo from Honduras, El Diario of Medellín, México Moderno in Mexico City, Proa from Argentina and others.

In 1923, Weber appeared in the film, Las emboscadas de Cupido the second film made by Francisco Arturo Palau, pioneer of Dominican film. Her appearance in the film, made her one of the first actresses in the Dominican Republic. (Note: Though some sources have stated Weber was the first Dominican actress, Palau's first film, La aparición de Nuestra Señora de la Altagracia had one female actor, Alma Zolessi a Venezuelan-Italian. In Las emboscadas de Cupido, Weber and Evangelina Landestoy both appeared.) Soon after her film shoot was done, Weber married Máximo Coiscou y Henríquez, with whom she would have a child, Rodolfo Coiscou Weber the following year. For the decade after Weber and Coicou married, they would alternate living in Europe with living in Santo Domingo, as he was a diplomat and the in charge of the Dominican Official Mission for Research in the Archives of Spain and France. They lived at various times in Austria, France and Spain. When the couple first left the Dominican Republic, they arrived in Seville and later moved to Madrid. Weber worked with the Sisters of Charity in Madrid, who had founded a nursery and home for orphans. She also lived in Paris, Switzerland and Vienna and during this time added three more sons to the family, Enrique, Antonio and Salvador Coiscou Weber. Her painting in her first phase (1920–1930) tended to be monochrome figures or meditations of affective piety.

In August, 1927, Weber returned to Santo Domingo with her mother-in-law, Altagracia Henríquez Perdomo de Coiscou. Feminism had waned on the island after the U.S. occupation ended, to revive the movement, but give the movement a new focus, Weber and Abigail Mejía Solière founded the Club Nosotras in 1927. The club broadly focused on promotion of the arts and culture, but were also involved in attaining suffrage. In 1931, the club reorganized as Dominican Feminist Action (Spanish: Acción Feminista Dominicana (AFD)) with Mejía serving as director general and Weber as the secretary-general. The organization would become the most important feminist group of the era. In 1934, Weber's marriage ended, after a tumultuous decade characterized by her husband's bouts of jealousy and alcoholism. She began publishing again; many pieces she had written in the 1920s, like "Accuas vivas" were first released after the dissolution of her marriage. She also entered the second phase of her painting development, which spanned from about 1930–1960. During this period, Weber's classical training was evident in the mostly portraits and still lifes she produced. Her palette consisted of four principal colors—black, brown, green, and yellow—accented with pink. Subjects, whether figures or forms were at rest, painted as she saw them without movement or nudity. The stagnant forms were a commentary of the restrictions on her life.

In 1934 with the rise of the authoritarian president Rafael Trujillo, Abigail Mejía steered AFD to align with Trujillo in the hopes for an increase in women's rights. In that year, a test vote was held to see how women would vote if they were granted suffrage and Mejía declared that "96,427 feminist and trujillista women voted". In return for their support, Trujillo revised the civil code to give women full citizenship in 1940. The following year, Mejía died and Weber ascended to the office of director general for the AFD, continuing to press for more rights. At the same time, in 1941, Weber and her son Rodolfo worked together to establish the Alpha & Omega Recreational Literary Club. (Spanish: Club Literario Recreativo Alfa & Omega). Held in Weber's home and headed by Rodolfo, with Weber advising, the club functioned as a literary and music salon, where members performed and critiqued artistic works. In 1942, the AFD became the Women's Branch of the Dominican Party, losing the club's autonomy. There was little choice, as only party members could mobilize and be politically active. That same year, women were guaranteed equal access to education and employment, married women were granted civil equality with their spouses and all women attained suffrage.

With the push for civil and political rights over, Weber's focus changed to her personal life. She married the Spanish exile, Álvaro Cartea Bonmatí. During the decade between 1942 and 1952, she published the majority of her works, including Los viajeros (1944), Apuntes (1949), Los bellos designios (1949) and Dora y otros cuentos (1952). In 1952, Alpha and Omega Club folded because of accusations by Trujillo that Rodolfo was plotting against the government and propagating communist doctrines. In 1960, Weber entered the final stage of her painting trajectory. Early works moved toward Impressionism, with her usual four color palette supplemented with blues and violets. Toward the end of the decade, her works moved toward abstract expressionism, using a broader range of colors incorporating bright white lights, celestial blues, lilac, orange and purple tones. In 1969, she prepared her first solo show of 42 canvases, which was well received by reviewers, who praised her landscapes as pictorial and filled with intense emotion with a well-balanced sense of harmony and color. Around the same time, Pedro René Contín Aybar, published twelve photographs of Weber's works taken by Napoleón Leroux in a volume, Exposición de Delia Weber.

== Death and legacy ==
Weber died on 28 December 1982 at the family home on Calle Arzobispo Meriño. She was buried in Christ the Redeemer Cemetery after a ceremony for family and friends.

== Selected works ==
=== Paintings ===
- Del tocador (The dressing table) (1932)
- El estudiante (The student) (1932)
- Jarrón con flores y libros (Vase with flowers and books) (1940)
- Del agua (The Water)
- Paisaje crepuscular (Twilight landscape)
- Arbustos en el río (Shrubs in the river)
- Flores (Flowers)
- Paisaje azul (Blue landscape)
- Bodegón (Still life)
- Hora violeta (Violet hour)
- Girasoles (Sunflowers)
- Cima blanca (White top)
- Rosa (Roses)
- Paisaje Marino (Sea Landscape)
- Marina (Marina)
- Margaritas (1968)
- Desequilibrio cósmico (Cosmic imbalance) (1971)
- El último paisaje (The last landscape) (1980)

=== Poems ===
- Ascuas vivas (Live Embers) (1939)
- Encuentro (Encounter) (1939)
- Apuntes (Aims) (1949)
- Espigas al sol (Spikes in the Sun) (1959)
- Estancia (Estate) (1972)

=== Plays ===
- Los viajeros (The Travelers) (1944)
- Los Bellos designios/Lo eterno (Beautiful Designs/The Eternal)(1949)

=== Narratives ===
- Dora y otros cuentos (Dora and other short stories) (1952)
