= Centro Obrero de Habla Española =

Hispanic communist organization

- Formation: 1927
- Founder: Alberto Moreau
- Founded at: East Harlem, New York City, New York, U.S.
- Purpose: Community organization

The Centro Obrero de Habla Española (English: Spanish-speaking Workers' Center) was a communist community organization founded in East Harlem, New York City, New York in 1927 by Argentinian activist Alberto Moreau. Members included people of Cuban, Puerto Rican, Spanish, and Venezuelan descent. Its newspaper, La Vida Obrera (transl. 'The Worker's Life') played a significant role in the unionization of hotel workers in New York City. After a 1929 convention of the Communist Party USA, a national network of Centros was established, with branches in Chicago, Illinois; Detroit, Michigan; and Youngstown, Ohio.

== Notable members ==
- Alberto Moreau – Founder of the Centro
- Jesús Colón – Puerto Rican politician and writer
- Luisa Moreno – Guatemalan-American labor activist (1907–1992)

== Sources ==
- Burt, Kenneth C. (2012). "The American Communist Party's Spanish Bureau: Third Period Activities and some Subsequent Impact". American Communist History. 11 (3): 265–283. doi:10.1080/14743892.2012.748336.
- Delgado, Linda C. (2005). "Jesús Colón and the Making of a New York City Community, 1917 to 1974". In Whalen, Carmen Teresa; Vázquez-Hernández, Víctor (eds.). The Puerto Rican Diaspora: Historical Perspectives. Philadelphia: Temple University Press. pp. 68–87. ISBN 1-59213-412-2.
- McNamara, Sarah (2016). From Picket Lines to Picket Fences: Latinas and the Remaking of the Jim Crow South, 1930-1964 (Doctoral thesis). Chapel Hill: University of North Carolina at Chapel Hill.
- Ruiz, Vicki L. (2007). "Of Poetics and Politics: The Border Journeys of Luisa Moreno". In Harley, Sharon (ed.). Women's Labor in the Global Economy: Speaking in Multiple Voices. New Brunswick; London: Rutgers University Press. pp. 26–45. ISBN 978-0-8135-4043-6.
