= Minerva Bernardino =

Dominican diplomat (1907–1998)

- Bernardino in 1946
- Born: 1907; El Seibo, Dominican Republic
- Died: August 29, 1998 (aged 90–91)
- Occupation: Diplomat
- Known for: Charter of the UN signee

Minerva Bernardino (1907 – August 29, 1998) was a diplomat from the Dominican Republic who promoted women's rights internationally, and is best known as one of the four women to sign the original charter of the United Nations. Minerva Bernardino championed gender inclusive language in the Charter.

== Biography ==
Bernardino was born in El Seibo in 1907 to an "unusually liberal" family. She was orphaned at age 15 and moved to Santo Domingo, where she finished secondary school as part of a new generation of Normalistas—Latin American women pursuing education beyond primary school—and began a career in the Dominican Republic's civil service. Bernardino's attention was drawn to issues of inequality and women's rights when she received a promotion within the civil service but no increase in pay because the government refused to pay any woman more than it paid her male co-workers. In her autobiography, she says "fue éste el impacto que me lanzó a la lucha por los derechos de la mujer." This background in the civil service which launched Bernardino's fight for women's rights distinguishes her from many of the feminists of her time: she was not a member of the elite or professional class, but a single woman who had worked part-time jobs, and would continue to work similar jobs even as she became more involved in activism and diplomacy.

In the early 1930s Bernardino struggled with the ascendant dictatorship of Rafael Trujillo, retreating for a short period to the United States to work with the Inter-American Commission of Women with who she had become familiar during her work as representative to the 1927 meeting of the Pan American Union in Montevideo. However, by late-decade she returned to the country in order to pressure the solidifying regime to grant suffrage to women which it ultimately did in 1942. One of the key public moves toward women's rights made by the regime occurred when the regime granted an invitation to the suffragist Doris Stevens, with whom Bernardino was close, to visit the country in 1938 and speak to the Senate. Bernardino continued to work with the dictatorship through its demise in 1961. She similarly supported the 12-years of continuismo of his successor Joaquín Balaguer.

In her advocacy for women's rights, Bernardino was admired for her bravery and honesty, often pioneering women's rights not only in official documents, but also in her everyday interactions. Kathleen Tesch highlights these traits in an anecdote included in Akmaral Arystanbekova's article "Diplomacy: Too important to be left to men?":

Once, the person presiding a General Assembly session addressed the women delegates as 'Dear Ladies', instead of 'Distinguished Delegates'. Before he could finish what he was saying, Ms. Bernardino had asked for the floor on a procedural motion. 'You can call us ladies when you offer us a cup of coffee or tea, or ask us out to lunch; here, in this room, we are not ladies, we are delegates, and should be addressed accordingly.'

At the end of her life, Bernardino reflected on her fight for the rights of women with some satisfaction, but admitted to having wanted more change more rapidly: "Fue una época, que parece que no se va repetir. Pero me siento contenta, porque se avanzó bastante; sembré buena semilla, y ha ido dando sus frutos, aunque no con la celeridad que me hubiera gustado."

== Key ideas and contributions ==
Bernardino worked mainly to advance political rights, and especially to improve women's suffrage in Latin American states. Her achievements include the 1954 Convention on the Political Rights of Women, which asserted women's rights to vote, run for office and hold office. Bernardino also supported international law that would ensure the equality of women in marriage and divorce, such as the Montevideo Convention on the Nationality of Married Women of 1933.

Of all her contributions, Bernardino is best known for arguing in favor of gender-inclusive language in the early stages of the UN's development. At the 1945 United Nations Conference on International Organization, although she was technically a delegate of the Dominican Republic—sent by dictator Rafael Trujillo as a "low-risk opportunity to appear progressive"—Bernardino entered the conference with her own agenda, representing the interests of the Inter-American Commission of Women (IACW). Bernardino and her colleague Berta Lutz were acknowledged as "instrumental" in the inclusion of the phrases "equal rights of men and women," "faith in fundamental human rights" and "the dignity and worth of the human person" in the preamble to the UN's charter. She is also credited with the wording "equal rights of men and women" in the preamble for the Universal Declaration of Human Rights—she believed that omitting "and women" would have seemed intentional and invited discrimination.

Bernardino was also involved in creating and later chairing the United Nations Commission on the Status of Women (CSW), which was established in 1946. Although subordinate to the Commission on Human Rights, the CSW was known for exercising independence and initiative. This commission's accomplishments include the gender-inclusive language in the Universal Declaration of Human Rights and the creation of the 1967 Declaration on the Elimination of Discrimination Against Women. The Commission also promoted women's rights through studies of the treatment of women, and used their findings to call for more change.

== Positions ==
Bernardino began her fight for women's rights as one of the leaders of Acción Feminista Dominicana, an organization she became involved in while she was still living in the Dominican Republic. In 1935, she moved to Washington D.C. to work for the IACW. She maintained connections with Dominican Republic stayed away for several years because of her initial opposition to Trujillo's dictatorship. By the 1940s, she was serving as the nation's official representative to the IACW, becoming vice chair and then chair of the commission. She attended conferences as a representative of the Dominican Republic, including the 1945 San Francisco Conference, where she signed the original charter for the United Nations.

As her career progressed, Bernardino continued to work at the UN in many different capacities. Not only did she participate in fifteen General Assemblies as the Dominican Republic's permanent representative (appointed in 1950), she also held many different leadership positions within the organization. She was elected vice president of the Commission of the Status of Women in 1951 and president of the commission 1953. She was also the first vice president of the United Nations Economic and Social Council and the first vice president of UNICEF. Later, Bernardino extended the scope of her work to include giving lectures at universities, writing a biographical archive of influential American women, and creating the Fundación Bernardino which would continue the fight for women's rights in the Dominican Republic after her death.
