= Luisa Moreno =

Guatemalan-American labor activist (1907–1992)

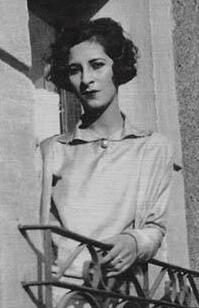
- Luisa Moreno in Mexico City, 1927
- Born: Blanca Rosa Rodríguez López; August 30, 1907; Guatemala City, Guatemala
- Died: November 4, 1992 (aged 85); Guatemala
- Occupations: Leader in US labor movement, social activist

Blanca Rosa Rodríguez López (August 30, 1907 – November 4, 1992), known professionally as Luisa Moreno, was a Guatemalan-American labor and civil rights activist. She worked as an organizer for the United Cannery, Agricultural, Packing, and Allied Workers of America (UCAPAWA), eventually becoming the union's vice president in 1941, making her the first Latina to be elected to a high-ranking national position in a trade union in the United States. She was also the primary organizer behind El Congreso de Pueblos de Habla Española (transl. "The Spanish-Speaking Peoples' Congress"), the first national Latino civil rights conference held in the United States.

Born in Guatemala to a wealthy family, Moreno founded the Gabriela Mistral Society to advocate for women's education before moving to Mexico City. There, she worked as a journalist and wrote poetry before emigrating again, this time to East Harlem, New York City, where she worked in a garment sweatshop to support her family. She became politically active in New York, joining the Communist Party USA (CPUSA) and organizing Latina garment workers there under La Liga de Costureras (transl. "The League of Seamstresses"), a union affiliated with the International Ladies Garment Workers Union (ILGWU). Dissatisfied with the ILGWU's lack of support for Latina workers, she accepted a position with the American Federation of Labor (AFL) to organize Black and Latino cigar workers in Florida.

Moreno worked with the AFL in Florida for two years but became disillusioned with their unwillingness to advocate for workers of color and their revisions to a contract she had negotiated on behalf of local workers. As a result, she resigned from the AFL and joined the UCAPAWA, which assigned her to organize a pecan shellers strike in San Antonio, Texas. She later moved to Los Angeles, California, where she became known as the "California Whirlwind". She organized cannery workers throughout the state, including at the California Sanitary Canning Company (Cal San) and Val Vita, where her efforts led to significant improvements in wages and conditions, as well as an on-site daycare. Moreno also established two defense committees for young Chicano men during the early 1940s: one in the aftermath of the Sleepy Lagoon murder trial and one in the aftermath of the Zoot Suit Riots.

Moreno retired from public life in 1947. After being threatened with deportation in 1948 and testifying before the House Un-American Activities Committee (HUAC), she left the United States and returned to Guatemala. While there, Moreno organized educational campaigns for Indigenous women. After the 1954 Guatemalan coup d'état, she was forced to flee to Mexico and later to Cuba. She eventually returned to Mexico and subsequently Guatemala, where she died in 1992. Her contributions to organized labor have been recognized by labor activists including Bert Corona, Cesar Chavez, and Fred Ross. Scholars such as Vicki L. Ruiz and Theresa Gaye Johnson offer various interpretations of Moreno's legacy, highlighting her significant but often unacknowledged work in labor and immigrant rights activism as well as her promotion of interethnic solidarity.

== Early life ==
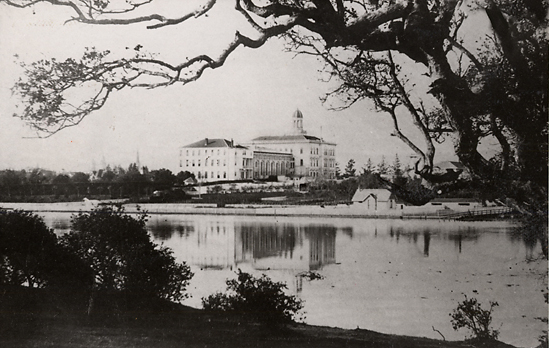
The Convent of the Holy Names, where Moreno was enrolled for four and a half years

Luisa Moreno was born Blanca Rosa Rodríguez López on August 30, 1907, in Guatemala City, Guatemala. Her father, Ernesto Rodríguez Robles, was a coffee grower, while her mother, Alicia López Sarana, was a prominent socialite from Colombia. Her family was wealthy. She lived on a large estate and was educated in both Spanish and French. When she was eight, she fell ill with a high fever. The attending doctor expressed concerns about her chances of survival, and her father vowed to dedicate her to a convent if she regained her health. Upon her recovery, he enrolled her at the Convent of the Holy Names in Oakland, California. During her four and a half years at the convent, she faced discrimination from her classmates due to her Hispanic heritage. She also became disillusioned with the Catholic Church—a disillusionment that stemmed, in part, from her observation that the nuns at the convent indulged in lavish meals during Lent while the aspirants subsisted on bread and water, which struck her as hypocritical.

Moreno returned to Guatemala at the age of 15. While she hoped to pursue a university education, women in Guatemala were excluded from such opportunities. As a result, she organized a group of other affluent young women into the Gabriela Mistral Society, named for the Chilean educator, journalist, and poet. The society campaigned for women's entry into universities by circulating petitions and lobbying politicians, as well as publishing a literary magazine. Moreno was accepted into university during the early 1920s but had a "change of heart" and instead moved to Mexico City to explore her interest in art and poetry.

While in Mexico City, Moreno mingled with local bohemians such as Diego Rivera and Frida Kahlo, supporting herself by working as a journalist. She published a book of poetry titled El Vendedor de Cocuyos (transl. Vendor of the Fireflies) in 1927. On November 27, 1927, she married Miguel Ángel de León, a Guatemalan veteran of the French Foreign Legion during World War I who was 16 years her elder. In a 1987 interview, Moreno reported that on their wedding night, de León took her to a "horrible hotel", where he claimed to have "business, womanizing". However, the couple remained together, and Moreno became pregnant within a few months of the marriage. In 1928, the couple moved to New York City aboard the SS Monterey in pursuit of economic opportunities.

== Activism ==
=== East Harlem ===
Moreno and de León settled in a tenement building in the neighborhood of East Harlem. East Harlem would eventually become known as "Spanish Harlem" due to a wave of Puerto Rican migration beginning in the 1930s, but during the 1920s, it was a diverse neighborhood with significant Black, Eastern European Jewish, Finnish, Italian, and Scandinavian populations. Moreno's daughter, Mytyl Lorraine, was born in November 1928. In order to support Mytyl and de León, who was unemployed, Moreno took a job at a garment sweatshop. Moreno later identified an incident from this time period—the alleged (Note: Ruiz claims that this "could be construed as an apocryphal tale".) death of a friend's baby, whose face was eaten by a rat—as the beginning of her "political awakening". Determined to change the material conditions of her fellow workers, Moreno joined the Centro Obrero de Habla Española (transl. 'Spanish-speaking Workers' Center'), an influential communist community organization.

In 1930, Moreno joined the Communist Party USA (CPUSA). That same year, she organized La Liga de Costureras (transl. 'The League of Seamstresses'), a small garment workers' union that consisted of her coworkers at the sweatshop and was affiliated with the International Ladies Garment Workers Union (ILGWU). Uniquely for its time, the liga employed a "fraternal group", a male auxiliary tasked with generating publicity, raising funds, and procuring refreshments for the union. Also in 1930, Moreno participated in a protest against the murder of Gonzalo González, who was killed by police during a picket he had organized against the film Under a Texas Moon, which he believed contained anti-Mexican themes. She later told Mexican-American labor and community activist Bert Corona that González's murder and the subsequent protest "motivated her to work on behalf of unifying the Spanish-speaking communities".

As of 1935, Moreno was working full-time as a union organizer for the ILGWU, but she had become disillusioned with the union's unwillingness to advocate for Latina workers. She had also befriended a taxi driver named Gray Bemis, who attended political meetings with her and gave her rides. While she was attracted to Bemis, she did not act on her feelings because both she and Bemis were married. In late 1935, she left her husband and the CPUSA and accepted a position with the American Federation of Labor (AFL), where she was tasked with organizing Black and Latino cigar workers in Florida. She and Mytyl traveled to Florida by bus.

=== Florida ===
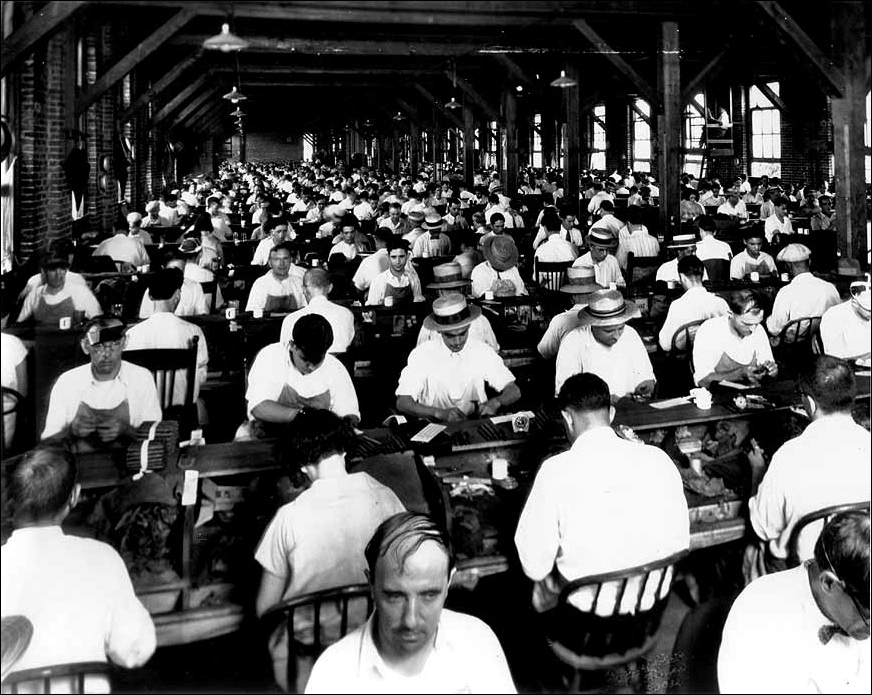
Workers rolling cigars at a factory in Ybor City, Florida. Moreno organized cigar workers throughout the state from 1936 to 1937.

Moreno arrived in Florida in early 1936. At the time, the Ku Klux Klan was known for employing terror tactics against labor activists there. Another labor activist and friend of Moreno's, Joseph Shoemaker, had been murdered by the Klan several months before her arrival. The AFL hoped that that Klan would not target Moreno because she was a light-skinned woman, and according to Moreno, the Klan never threatened her while she was in Florida, though a worker did attempt to kill her with an ice pick during a union meeting. It was in Florida that she assumed the professional name "Luisa Moreno". Historian Vicki L. Ruiz theorizes that she adopted the name "Luisa" in reference to Puerto Rican labor organizer Luisa Capetillo, who also organized cigar workers in Florida, and that she adopted the name "Moreno", which means "dark", to contrast with her given name, Blanca Rosa, which means "white rose". According to Ruiz, Moreno's close friends continued to call her "Rosa". Due to her busy schedule and her concerns about the Klan, Moreno left Mytyl with various informal foster families during their time in Florida. While some of these families treated Mytyl well, she later reported that one of her caretakers sexually abused her without Moreno's knowledge.

While in Florida, Moreno helped to negotiate a contract that covered 13,000 cigar workers across the state. However, AFL officials ultimately revised the contract to make it more favorable to management. As a result, Moreno advised the workers to reject the new contract. At a subsequent AFL convention held in Tampa in 1936, Moreno was part of a delegation of organizers demanding adjustments to union members' dues, as well as the creation of an international union for food processing and agriculture. She also delivered a speech criticizing the earlier contract revisions and arguing that the union was not adequately serving workers of color. While the AFL ignored Moreno's delegation's demands, the delegation ultimately went on to establish its envisioned union, the United Cannery, Agricultural, Packing, and Allied Workers of America (UCAPAWA), on July 9, 1937, in Denver, Colorado. Concerned that Moreno's involvement with the delegation would negatively impact their Florida operations, the AFL made plans to transfer her to Pennsylvania.

Before she left Florida, Moreno helped to organize two significant demonstrations in Ybor City. The first was a protest held on May 6, 1937, in support of the Popular Front, a Spanish electoral alliance consisting of a variety of left-wing organizations that had triumphed in the 1936 Spanish general election. Participants in the march included female cigar workers and garment workers employed by the Works Progress Administration (WPA), who engaged in a city-wide march towards city hall where they presented their demands for solidarity with the Popular Front to the mayor. The second was a strike action staged on July 8 by WPA garment workers, who demanded the reinstatement of 88 women who had been fired in order to limit the impact of a possible strike, as well as a 20% wage increase. Although the strike initially included both white and Latina women, the white workers, unused to labor actions and worried about the potential repercussions for themselves and their families, returned to work after the first day. Weakened by the white women's return to work, the strike ended on July 14 without achieving its demands.

=== Texas ===
Per her reassignment, Moreno briefly moved to Pennsylvania, where she continued to organize cigar workers. However, she resigned from the AFL in 1937 and joined the UCAPAWA, who assigned her to help organize a pecan shellers strike in San Antonio, Texas. (Note: Some sources, such as Larralde & Griswold de Castillo claim that Moreno moved to San Diego in 1937. However, other sources, such as Ruiz, make no reference to this, instead providing detailed documentation of her work in Texas.) The strike had begun on January 31, 1938, with 6,000–8,000 workers, primarily Mexican, walking out to protest a proposed pay cut, poor working conditions, and the practice of "home work", in which shelling tasks were contracted to families working from home for extremely low wages. Emma Tenayuca had been elected honorary strike leader, but when Moreno arrived, Tenayuca reluctantly granted her authority to manage the situation as she saw fit. While she initially faced distrust from local workers, who viewed her as an outsider because she was not Mexican or from Texas, Moreno was ultimately able to negotiate a settlement that included restructured piece-rate scales that increased workers' overall wages, as well as recognition of the UCAPAWA local. However, historian Zaragosa Vargas notes that the shelling companies did not honor the promised wage increase, instead implementing mechanization techniques that displaced thousands of shellers. After the strike, Moreno traveled throughout the Lower Rio Grande Valley organizing Mexican migrant workers.

=== El Congreso de Pueblos de Habla Española ===
Due to the financial strain of managing farm labor campaigns in Texas and California, the UCAPAWA shifted its organizing efforts to cannery and packinghouse workers. As a result, Moreno was pulled from her organizing work in Texas, but before her next assignment, she asked for a leave of absence to organize a conference for Latino civil rights. Leaving Mytyl at a boarding house in San Antonio, she traveled to Los Angeles, California, where the conference—which was called El Congreso de Pueblos de Habla Española (transl. "The Spanish-Speaking Peoples' Congress")—was held from April 28–30, 1939. According to Ruiz, it was the first national Latino civil rights conference ever held. The conference was attended by 1,000 to 1,500 delegates, representing over 120 organizations, mostly from California and the Southwestern United States. Significant attendees included Bert Corona and Josefina Fierro de Bright. The platform developed by the congress demanded an end to segregation in education, employment, housing, public facilities, and distribution of public assistance. It also affirmed immigrants' rights to live and work in the United States without fear of deportation, encouraged the preservation of Latino cultures over assimilation into the United States, recommended the establishment of Latino studies departments within universities, and identified the "double discrimination" faced by Mexican women as part of its "woman's platform". After the congress, Moreno was briefly assigned to Colorado, organizing a labor school for beet farmers in Denver.

=== California ===
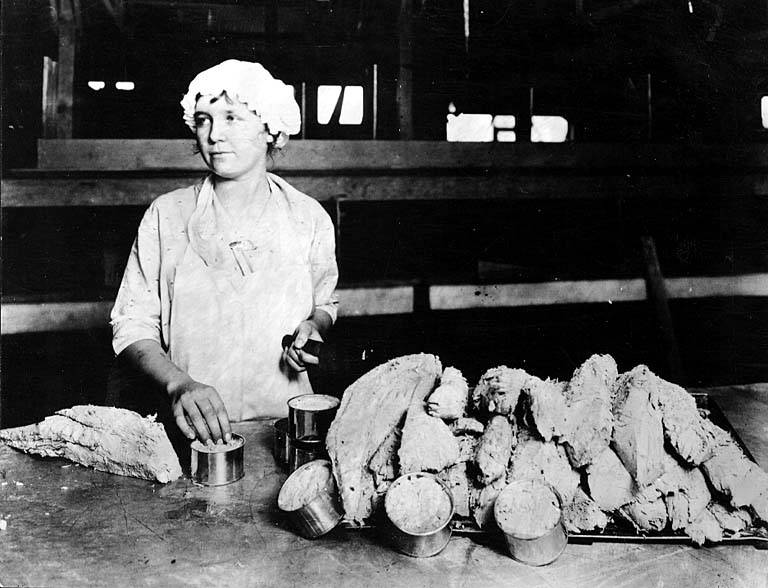
Worker filling tuna cans in Long Beach, California. Moreno organized cannery workers throughout the state during the 1940s.

According to historians Carlos M. Larralde and Richard Griswold del Castillo, Moreno moved to Los Angeles in 1940 to work on Noticias de UCAPAWA (transl. 'UCAPAWA News'), the UCAPAWA's Spanish-language newspaper. However, according to Ruiz, she edited Noticias de UCAPAWA in Washington, D.C., moving to Los Angeles with Mytyl after she was elected vice president of the UCAPAWA in 1941. Both sources agree that she moved to Los Angeles at some point in order to organize cannery workers, becoming known as the "California Whirlwind". She organized union drives for workers at the California Sanitary Canning Company (Cal San) and California Walnut, which led to the creation of Local 3, the second-largest UCAPAWA local in the United States.

Moreno also helped to expand the UCAPAWA's influence throughout Southern California, including to Fullerton, Riverside, Redlands, Santa Ana, San Diego, and the San Joaquin Valley. In San Diego, she organized workers with several companies, including the California Packing Corporation, the Marine Products Company, the Old Mission Packing Corporation, Van Camp Sea Food Company, and Westgate Sea Products. Meanwhile, in Fullerton, she campaigned on behalf of the UCAPAWA during a 1942 National Labor Relations Board (NLRB) election at Val Vita, the largest cannery in the state. During this election, Val Vita employees voted to determine whether they would be represented by the UCAPAWA, the AFL, a company union, or no union at all. Under Moreno's guidance, the UCAPAWA achieved a decisive victory, leading to higher wages, better working conditions, and an on-site daycare at the cannery, which was financed by management. Moreno also advocated for racially integrated hiring at Cal San, which resulted in an agreement by the owners to hire Black women in 1942.

Also in 1942, Moreno became involved in the Sleepy Lagoon murder trial, which concerned the death of a man named José Díaz near El Monte, California. The murder sparked widespread panic regarding the potential involvement of pachuco gangs, which led to the arrests of 300 young Chicano men, of whom 12 were convicted of murder and 5 were convicted of assault. Moreno and Bert Corona formed the Sleepy Lagoon Defense Committee, arguing that the convictions were racially motivated.

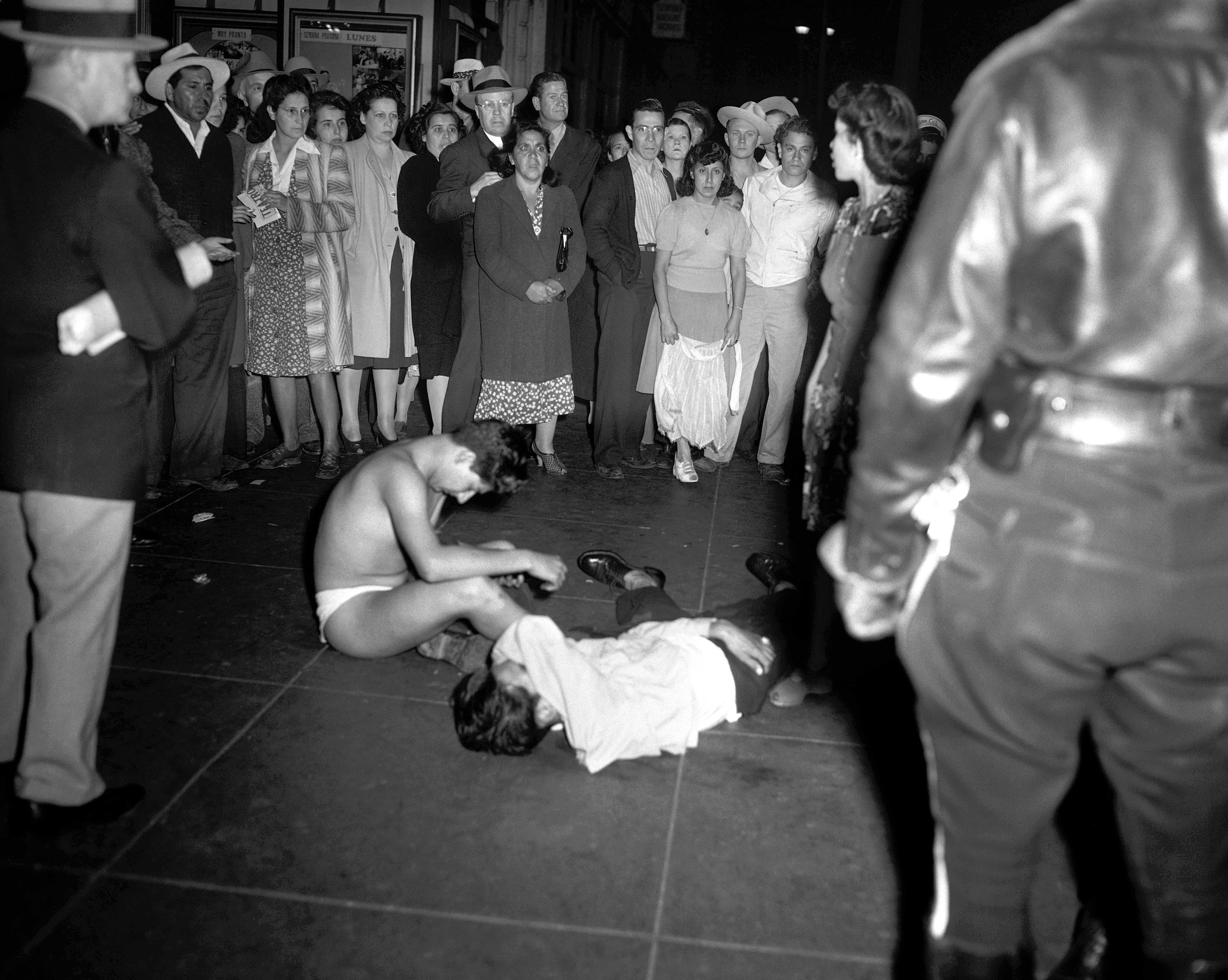
Victims of the Zoot Suit Riots. Moreno was part of a defense committee advocating for the victims of the riots, who were targeted by members of the United States Armed Forces.

On June 3, 1943, the Zoot Suit Riots broke out in Los Angeles when 50 members of the United States Armed Forces traveled across Los Angeles in search of pachucos, attacking several young men in front of the Carmen Theater and on Main Street. The violence escalated in the ensuing days, with 200 military personnel injuring over 150 Latinos. Local media characterized the riots as a "war" between pachucos and military personnel, and police arrested over 500 Latinos, allegedly for disorderly conduct. Moreno and Corona formed another defense committee to advocate for the arrestees. Working alongside personnel from the Mexican consulate and the UCAPAWA, as well as San Diego Councilor Charles Dail, Moreno began investigating the military's conduct during the riots, concluding that:

The hysteria against the Sleepy Lagon [sic] defendants and the Pachucos over all was the outward manifestation of a complex fear in Southern California that Mexicans were moving more into the essential industries like agriculture, the food-processing commerce, the garment commerce, construction and other businesses.

While investigating the Zoot Suit Riots, Moreno continued to engage in labor activism in the El Monte region. In addition to becoming a leading figure in a local walnut growers' union, she also served on the California state council of the Congress of Industrial Organizations (CIO), making her the first Latina to serve on a CIO state council. In 1944, the UCAPAWA changed its name to the Food, Tobacco, Agricultural, and Allied Workers (FTA), and in 1945, Moreno led a campaign to affiliate several locals—which the AFL had turned over to the International Brotherhood of Teamsters—with the newly renamed union. The FTA established 25 locals in Northern California and won an election to represent 72 plants in October 1945. However, the Teamsters challenged the election results, lobbying the NLRB to rescind them and initiating a blockade against FTA-affiliated canneries. As a result, in February 1946, the NLRB called a second election to be held. In the leadup to the election, the Teamsters influenced workers to vote for them through a combination of intimidation, physical force, red-baiting, and sweetheart deals. The FTA lost the second election, and in 1947, Moreno retired from public activity and married Gray Bemis following their reunion at a CIO dance in San Francisco.

== Later life ==
In 1948, Moreno was threatened with deportation from the United States. According to Moreno, the deportation threat was a consequence of her refusal to testify against union leader Harry Bridges in exchange for United States citizenship. Moreno had also been under surveillance by the Federal Bureau of Investigation (FBI) since at least 1941, and the FBI had claimed to have identified her as an active member of the CPUSA by 1948. In September of that year, Moreno testified before the House Un-American Activities Committee (HUAC), which had been used to target allegedly subversive activity since the Republican Party gained control of the United States House of Representatives in the 1946 United States elections. Ultimately, Moreno elected to voluntarily leave the United States "under warrant of deportation" with Bemis in 1950, returning to Guatemala.

In Guatemala, Moreno organized educational campaigns among Indigenous women on behalf of President Jacobo Árbenz, teaching them reading, writing, and mathematics. When Árbenz was deposed by the Central Intelligence Agency during the 1954 Guatemalan coup d'état, Moreno and Bemis went into hiding and subsequently fled to Mexico, where they raised chickens near Mexico City until Bemis's death in 1960. Moreno then moved to Cuba, where she worked as a translator for some time before returning to Mexico to be closer to her daughter and grandchildren in 1963. During the mid-1960s, she managed an art gallery in Tijuana. Labor activists Cesar Chavez and Dolores Huerta were known to visit the gallery on occasion, seeking her advice. In 1984, as her health deteriorated, she attempted to enter the United States for medical treatment but was denied. She instead returned to Guatemala to live with her brother in a children's playhouse on their family's estate. She died in Guatemala on November 4, 1992.

== Legacy ==
Moreno's legacy as a significant figure in American labor history has been acknowledged by figures such as Bert Corona, Cesar Chavez, and Fred Ross. She was featured in a mural as part of the Great Wall of Los Angeles, designed by artist Judy Baca during the 1970s and 1980s. In 2018, she was the subject of an installation at the Smithsonian National Museum of American History as part of its "American Enterprise" exhibition, with exhibit curator Mireya Loza stating that she considers Moreno's life story to be an important part of American history. She was also featured in a Google Doodle in 2023 as part of National Hispanic Heritage Month in the United States.

Scholars have offered various interpretations of Moreno's life. Ruiz argues that Moreno has been largely overlooked despite her significant national presence and vital contributions to the rights of working people and immigrants. According to Ruiz, Moreno's legacy is part of a long history of Latino labor activism, inspiring figures like Dolores Huerta, co-founder of the National Farm Workers Association (NFWA), which would eventually become the United Farm Workers (UFW). Meanwhile, academic Gaye Theresa Johnson claims that Moreno's work in "spaces of Latina congregation" demonstrates how such spaces provide the material basis for social justice struggles. Johnson further posits that Moreno possessed a unique "cartographic imagination"— a concept developed by anthropologist David Harvey to describe an awareness of how remote actions impact local people's lives—that helped her to facilitate interethnic alliances between Black and Latino workers, as at Cal San.

== Sources ==
- Agusto-DaFonseca, Gustavo; Henken, Ted (2008). "East Harlem". In Schaefer, Richard T. (ed.). Encyclopedia of Race, Ethnicity, and Society. Vol. 1. Chicago: Sage. pp. 429–431.
- Chiodo, John J. (2013). "The Zoot Suit Riots: Exploring Social Issues in American History". The Social Studies. 104 (1): 1–14. doi:10.1080/00377996.2011.642421.
- Delgado, Linda C. (2005). "Jesús Colón and the Making of a New York City Community, 1917 to 1974". In Whalen, Carmen Teresa; Vázquez-Hernández, Víctor (eds.). The Puerto Rican Diaspora: Historical Perspectives. Philadelphia: Temple University Press. pp. 68–87. ISBN 1-59213-412-2.
- Garcia, Mario T. (1994). Memories of Chicano History: The Life and Narrative of Bert Corona. Berkeley; Los Angeles; London: University of California Press. ISBN 0-520-08219-2.
- Garcia, Matt (2016). "Cesar Chavez and the United Farm Workers Movement". Oxford Research Encyclopedia of American History. Oxford University Press. doi:10.1093/acrefore/9780199329175.013.217. ISBN 978-0-19-932917-5.
- Gutiérrez, José Angel (2021). The Eagle is Watching: FBI Files on Mexicans and Chicanos, 1940-1980. Lanham: Lexington Books. ISBN 978-1-7936-2453-6.
- Graham, Helen (1987). "The Spanish Popular Front and the Civil War". In Graham, Helen; Preston, Paul (eds.). The Popular Front in Europe. London: Palgrave Macmillan. pp. 106–130. doi:10.1007/978-1-349-10618-9_6. ISBN 978-1-349-10618-9.
- Johnson, Gaye Theresa (2013). Spaces of Conflict, Sounds of Solidarity Music, Race, and Spatial Entitlement in Los Angeles. Berkeley: University of California Press. ISBN 978-0-520-27528-7.
- Kim, Juliana (2023). "Google Doodle honors Guatemalan-American labor activist Luisa Moreno". NPR.
- Larralde, Carlos M.; Griswold del Castillo, Richard (1997). "Luisa Moreno and the Beginnings of the Mexican American Civil Rights Movement in San Diego". The Journal of San Diego History. 43 (3).
- Levin, Sam (2022). "Judy Baca, the renowned Chicana muralist who paints LA's forgotten history: 'My art is meant to heal'". The Guardian.
- McNamara, Sarah (2016). From Picket Lines to Picket Fences: Latinas and the Remaking of the Jim Crow South, 1930-1964 (Doctoral thesis). Chapel Hill: University of North Carolina at Chapel Hill.
- Michaels, Jonathan (2017). McCarthyism: The Realities, Delusions and Politics Behind the 1950s Red Scare. New York: Routledge. ISBN 978-0-203-76671-2.
- Rose, Margaret (2008). "Dolores Huerta: The United Farm Workers Union". In García, Mario T. (ed.). A Dolores Huerta Reader. Albuquerque: University of New Mexico Press. ISBN 978-0-8263-4513-4. OCLC 231724520.
- Ruiz, Vicki L. (1987). Cannery Women, Cannery Lives: Mexican Women, Unionization, and the California Food Processing Industry, 1930-1950. Albuquerque: University of New Mexico Press. ISBN 0-8263-1006-0.
- Ruiz, Vicki L. (1998). From Out of the Shadows: Mexican Women in Twentieth-Century America. New York: Oxford University Press. ISBN 978-0-19-537478-0.
- Ruiz, Vicki L. (2005). "Luisa Moreno and Latina Labor Activism". In Ruiz, Vicki L.; Sánchez Korrol, Virginia (eds.). Latina Legacies: Identity, Biography, and Community. New York: Oxford University Press. pp. 175–192. ISBN 978-0-19-515399-6.
- Ruiz, Vicki L. (2007). "Of Poetics and Politics: The Border Journeys of Luisa Moreno". In Harley, Sharon (ed.). Women's Labor in the Global Economy: Speaking in Multiple Voices. New Brunswick; London: Rutgers University Press. pp. 26–45. ISBN 978-0-8135-4043-6.
- Smith, Ryan P. (2018). "Guatemalan Immigrant Luisa Moreno Was Expelled From the U.S. for Her Groundbreaking Labor Activism". Smithsonian Magazine.
- Sullivan, Mary Lorretta; Blair, Bertha (1936). Women in Texas Industries: Hours, Wages, Working Conditions, and Home Work. Champaign: U.S. Government Printing Office.
- Vargas, Zaragosa (1997). "Tejana Radical: Emma Tenayuca and the San Antonio Labor Movement during the Great Depression". Pacific Historical Review. 66 (4): 553–580. doi:10.2307/3642237. JSTOR 3642237.
- Zárate, Salvador (2018). "Labor Activism during the Great Depression, 1930–1939". In Fernández, Lilia (ed.). 50 Events That Shaped Latino History: An Encyclopedia of the American Mosaic. Vol. 1. Santa Barbara: ABC-CLIO. pp. 364–382.
