= Abigail Mejia =

Dominican feminist (1895–1941)

Abigaíl Mejía Soliére
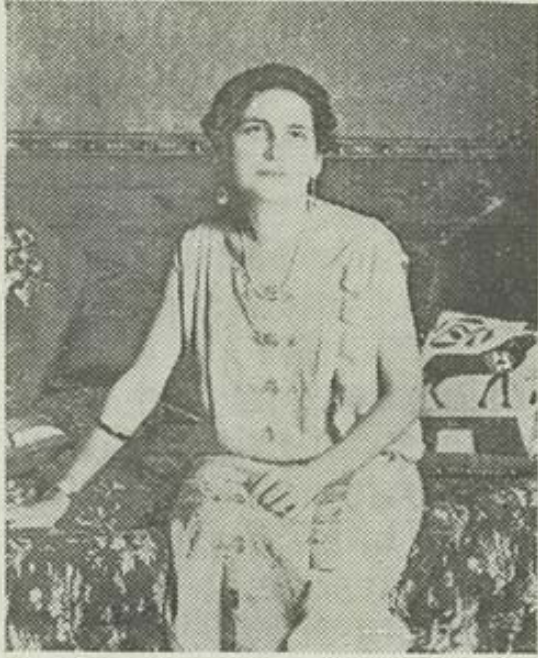
- Mejía in 1935
- Born: Ana Emilia Abigaíl Mejía Soliére; April 15, 1895; Santo Domingo, Dominican Republic
- Died: March 15, 1941 (aged 45); Santo Domingo, Dominican Republic
- Occupations: Educator, activist, writer, museum director

Ana Emilia Abigaíl Mejia Soliere (April 15, 1895 – March 15, 1941) was a feminist activist, nationalist, literary critic and educator from the Dominican Republic. She completed her primary education at the Salome Ureña de Henríquez School for Girls and Liceo Dominicano. In 1912, she became a teacher in Barcelona where she resided with her family. She returned to the Dominican Republic in 1925 and became a professor of Literature, Pedagogy and History at the Superior Normal School of Santo Domingo. She is one of the leading figures of feminism in the Dominican Republic, founding the Club Nosotras in 1927 and Acción Feminista Dominicana.

== Early life ==
Abigaíl Mejía was born in Santo Domingo, Dominican Republic on April 15, 1895. She was born into a family of intellectuals who influenced and nurtured her own future as an intellectual. Mejía completed primary school at the all-women's academy, Salomé Ureña de Henríquez, and at the Liceo Dominicano. While Mejía was still young, her family moved to Barcelona where she obtained a degree from normal school in 1919. She returned to Santo Domingo for a brief period of time that same year and then moved back to Barcelona in 1921.

In 1925, Mejía permanently settled in Santo Domingo where she worked as a professor of Spanish language and literature at the Escuela Normal Superior de Santo Domingo. It was during this time that she began her work with the feminist movement in the Dominican Republic heavily influenced by her encounters with feminist thought in Europe, particularly in metropolitan cities like Barcelona and Paris. During her time in Barcelona, Mejía developed friendships with pioneers of the literary and feminist movements in Spain, including Concha Espina (Santander, 1869 – Madrid, 1955), Blanca de los Ríos (Sevilla, 1862–1956), and Emilia Pardo Bazán (La Coruña, 1851 – Madrid, 1921) and these relationships influenced her work in the Dominican Republic.

== Career ==
=== Feminist activism ===
Mejía is considered a pioneer of feminism and the feminist movement in the Dominican Republic. She and her contemporaries Delia Weber and Livia Veloz co-founded Club Nosotras (literally 'our club'), a literary and cultural society for Dominican women. Club Nosotras was reorganized in 1931 with more explicitly political goals under the name Acción Feminista Dominicana (AFD). Mejía served as director general and Weber as secretary-general of the AFD, which became the most important feminist group of the era uniting mostly intellectual, middle to upper-class women from provinces across the nation. Some of the AFD's members included school teachers and writers such as Minerva Bernardino, Celeste Wos y Gil, Carmita Landestoy, Consuelo Bernardino, and Carmen Lara Fernandez. The AFD mobilized to "fight for the vindication of women's rights," particularly women's suffrage, but they likewise focused on penal facility reform, alcoholism, prostitution, illegal drugs, and other social welfare concerns.

It was around the time of the AFD's establishment that President Rafael Trujillo took office. Mejía and other members of the AFD led the group to closer ties with Trujillo in hope of attaining women's suffrage, which Trujillo suspected would popularize his regime. The AFD thus began to openly support Trujillo and Mejía even referred to him as "el presidente feminista" or "the feminist president" in a 1932 speech. Two years later, a "voto de ensayo," roughly translated to "trial vote," was held so women could vote to reform the Dominican constitution to include women's suffrage. The results revealed that most women who voted, including Mejía, wanted to reform the constitution but as Trujillo rose to power, the topic of women's suffrage was not recognized by the government until years later.

Women's suffrage in the Dominican Republic was not achieved until ten years later in 1942. By this time, the AFD had been coopted as an organization in support of Trujillo and some members of the AFD became known "damas trujillistas" or female supporters of Trujillo. The AFD was employed as a tool to normalize women's submissive role in society by exalting socio-political passivity as synonymous with righteousness and good citizenship in accordance with the regime.

=== Arts and culture ===
In 1926, Mejía published the "Plan on the Establishment of a National Museum in Santo Domingo" in Francisco A. Palau's journal, Black and White, which included reflections on experiences and observations from visiting the Prado, the Louvre, and the Pinacoteca in the Vatican. Trujillo appointed Mejía director of the Museo Nacional in 1933 and she was responsible for starting and running the institution.

Apart from her contributions to arts and culture via the Museo Nacional, Mejía is also known as the pioneer of a female gaze in photography in the Dominican Republic. She mainly recorded observations from her many trips using a Vest Pocket Kodak. Her photographs were published in a 1925 article for La Opinión, Revista Semanal Ilustrada (Year III, Vol. 15, 139 (3-IX-1925)) in Santo Domingo, marking the first time ever in Dominican history where a woman's photographs were published in a printed source.

=== Writings and speeches ===
Throughout her life, Mejía published articles in various national and international newspapers/magazines on a range of topics including women, literature, travel, and the Dominican Republic. Mejía wrote her first and only novel, Sueña Pilarín (1925), in Barcelona, a novel focused on the affective relationships between women as a vehicle to solidarity. Dominican author, Virgilio Díaz Grullón, writes of Sueña Pilarín (translated from Spanish):

It narrates with sweet and simple language, at times filled with humor, the story of a young girl from Dominican origins, but born and raised in Spain, who lives intense episodes in a tragedy-filled life that begins with her becoming an orphan, then suffering the pain of an adoption imposed on her, suffering the severity of living in a convent, battling an incestuous relationship and finally, finding love with a passionate, young Dominican man and ultimately finding the happiness life had cruelly denied her.

Mejía presented various speeches and conferences. Her public entrance into the Dominican feminist movement was the presentation of her speech, "Feminismo," in Santo Domingo in 1926. She also wrote the first history of Dominican literature in 1937 which was later published in 1939.

== Death and legacy ==
Mejía worked as a writer and director of the Museo Nacional until her death on March 15, 1941. She produced various texts and held different positions of power throughout her life, but did not live to see the legal reforms for full civil and political rights for women in the Dominican Republic.

== Selected works ==
- Sueña Pilarín (1925)
- "El idilio del pichoncito" (Fémina 94, 15 November 1926)

== See also ==
- Ana Emilia Abigaíl Mejia Soliere
- Women in the Dominican Republic
- History of the Dominican Republic
