= Josefina Fierro de Bright =

Mexican-American labor leader and social activist

- Born: 1914; Mexicali, Baja California
- Died: March 1998 (aged 83–84); Los Angeles, California
- Education: University of California, Los Angeles
- Occupations: leader in the United States labor movement and a social activist

Josefina Fierro (1914 – March 1998), later Josefina Fierro de Bright, was a Mexican-American leader who helped organize resistance against discrimination in the American Southwest during the Great Depression. Born in Mexicali, Baja California, she was the daughter of immigrants who fled revolution in Mexico to settle in California. She grew up in Los Angeles and the San Joaquin Valley.

Her mother emphasized the importance of education and urged Josefina to "Rely on yourself, be independent." In 1938, when Fierro was 18 years old, she entered the University of California, Los Angeles. She planned to study medicine, but activism on behalf of the Mexican American community took up most of her time and effort. Fierro de Bright gave up her studies at UCLA to become an organizer, and her style was described by veteran longshoremen's leader Bert Corona as "gutsy, flamboyant, and tough".

Aided by her husband John Bright, a Hollywood screenwriter and an activist himself, she began to lead boycotts of companies that did business in Mexican American communities but did not hire Mexican American workers. These activities brought her attention from a Mexican American group, El Congreso de Pueblos de Habla Española (Congress of Spanish-speaking Peoples), which was formed in 1938. El Congreso was organizing Hispanic migrants to stand up for their rights. In 1939 El Congreso leaders asked Fierro de Bright to help them to establish a branch in Los Angeles which represented a major effort by the Mexican American generation of the time, to form a working class movement that was aimed at securing basic rights for all Mexican and Spanish-speaking people in the United States.

== Early life ==
Josefina Fierro was involved in revolutionary activism from a young age. Her father, Plumo Fierro, had been an officer in Pancho Villa's revolutionary army, but it was her mother's passion for activism and commitment to helping others that most strongly influenced her life. Fierro had been raised by her mother, who had immigrated to the United States when Josefina was a baby. Because Josefina's mother's family were followers of the radical Mexican anarchist Ricardo Flores Magón, she had been taught to speak against injustice, to fight for what was right and to treat everyone with “dignity and respect”. According to Carlos Larralde, Josefina's mother would smuggle ammunition inside of Josefina's stroller back and forth from California to Baja California to support Flores Magón. Her father Plumo Fierro later gained an inheritance, in turn allowing Josefina to be able to go to the University of California, Josefina realized that she could make money without a form of higher education; leading her to drop out of UCLA. That was a reason why Josefina did not wish to meet with her parents, as well as a very short marriage that lead to an illegal abortion that left Josefina sterile.

== Personal life and activism ==
After high school graduation, Josefina Fierro decided to move to Los Angeles to live with an aunt; there she met and fell in love with Hollywood actor John Bright. Bright, who was blacklisted with several other actors in Hollywood due to allegations of having ties with the Communist Party, inspired Fierro's activism further. After marrying Bright, Josefina found herself in the midst of a campaign that defended Mexican immigrants and Mexican American rights against discrimination during the 1930s.

In 1938, at the age of eighteen, Fierro de Bright, who would become executive secretary, collaborated with Luisa Moreno and founded El Congreso de Pueblos de Habla Española, a Mexican civil rights organization that worked to fight for civil rights of Mexican immigrants and Mexican Americans and worker rights as well. Fierro de Bright took her and her husband's platform to Hollywood and used it to fund-raise revenue for El Congreso. Her networking in Hollywood brought in actors and other celebrities to help raise the revenue for the organization. Fierro de Bright, with Luisa Moreno, actively worked on issues that targeted the needs of lower-income and non-bilingual Mexicans to help them receive basic civil rights in the United States. Although El Congreso did not last very long, Fierro de Bright's activism did not end with its dissolution. In 1942, during the “Sleepy Lagoon” trial, after receiving complaints of cruel punishment from parents of the boys held in custody, Fierro de Bright organized a committee for the defendants. The committee, known as the Sleepy Lagoon Defense Committee, raised money so that those on trial could hire a lawyer to represent and defend them.

Fierro de Bright was in Los Angeles in 1943 at the start of the Zoot Suit Riots. She said of the violence, "I never believed that I could see a thing like that... I went downtown and my husband and I were standing there and we saw all these policemen hanging around... and hundreds of taxis with sailors hanging on with clubs in their hands, bullies just beating Mexicans on Main Street. And we went up and asked a cop to stop it: he says, 'You better shut up or I'll do the same to you.' You can't do a thing when you see people and the ambulances coming to pick them up and nobody is stopping the slaughter. It's a nightmare. It's a terrible thing to see."
