= Ofelia Schutte =

American philosophy professor (born 1945)

Philosophical work
- Institutions: University of South Florida, Yale University
- Main interests: Feminist theory, Latin American philosophy, Nietzsche, Continental philosophy, Philosophy of culture, Postcolonial feminism

Ofelia Schutte (born 1945) is Professor Emerita of Philosophy at the University of South Florida, where she had served as Professor of Philosophy since 2004, and as Professor of Women's Studies (and chair of the department) from 1999 until 2004. Schutte is recognized by many as a senior Latina feminist philosopher, and has played a crucial role in launching the field of Latin American philosophy and Latinx philosophy within the United States.

== Education and career ==
Schutte received her bachelor's in English from Barry College in 1966. After receiving her bachelor's, she went on to receive a master's degree in English from the University of Miami in 1969, a master's degree in philosophy from Miami University in 1970, and a doctorate in philosophy from Yale University in 1978, with her focus being the work of Friedrich Nietzsche and German philosophy following Immanuel Kant.

While working towards her degrees, Schutte served as an instructor of philosophy and English at Miami University. After receiving her doctorate, she accepted a position as Assistant Professor of Humanities at the University of Florida, transitioning to Philosophy one year later. She was promoted to Associate Professor in 1984, and full professor in 1994. After a 20-year teaching career at the University of Florida, in 1999 Schutte moved to the University of South Florida, where she chaired the Women's Studies Department. In 2004, Schutte left the Women's Studies department, and became Professor of Philosophy. In 2012, she received emerita status.

In addition to her university appointments, Schutte has served in a number of other professional roles, including chairing the American Philosophical Association's Committee on Hispanics/Latinos, and in a large number of editorial roles, including being associate editor and board member of Hypatia: A Journal of Feminist Philosophy between 1990 and 2006 (and continuing as an advisory board member since,) serving on the advisory board of the Cuadernos de Filosofia at the University of Buenos Aires since 2007, being a member of the editorial board of Teaching Philosophy from 2006 to 2011, and being a member of the editorial board of Mora: Revista del Area Interdisciplinaria de Estudios de la Mujer since 1995, and being a member of Journal of the Argentine Society of Women in Philosophy's between 1989 and 2000.

== Research areas ==
Including feminist and pro-Latino/Latina ideas in her work, Schutte has been described as an "unwavering" defender of feminist and Latina philosophy in the modern discourse, and has been acknowledged as a leader in feminist Latina philosophy. Some of her research was conducted as a Bunting scholar and a Fulbright scholar. One of her goals is to examine marginalized populations without attempting to engage in cultural assimilation. She has posited that all intercultural interaction is inherently incommensurate to some degree.

== Publications ==
Schutte's first publications were a feminist interpretation of Friedrich Nietzsche: her dissertation, which shared a title with her first book, Beyond Nihilism: Nietzsche Without Masks. In this book, she agrees with Nietzsche's efforts to deconstruct dualism and rejects nihilism as part of a dualist philosophy. However, she criticizes the political implications Nietzsche writes into his work. Her second book, Cultural Identity and Social Liberation in Latin American Thought, discussed the interaction of activist movements and the progressive philosophies behind them in 20th century Latin America. It was instrumental in bringing Latin American philosophy and thought to the United States. She was also one of the first philosophers to publish on Latin America in the United States, shortly behind Jorge Gracia.
