= Livia Veloz =

Dominican writer, teacher, and feminist activist

- Born: Livia María Veloz; September 11, 1892; Santo Domingo, Dominican Republic
- Died: March 21, 1980 (aged 87); Santo Domingo, Dominican Republic
- Occupations: Writer, teacher
- Notable work: Historia del Feminismo en la República Dominicana

Livia María Veloz (September 11, 1892 – March 21, 1980) was a Dominican writer, teacher, and feminist activist. Her poetry, novel, and primary school textbooks received several national and international awards. Veloz was a founding member of Acción Feminista Dominicana (AFD), an early feminist organization in the Dominican Republic. Veloz campaigned for women's suffrage and contributed to AFD initiatives such as teaching in night schools for working class women. She is considered a feminist pioneer, and her 1977 book Historia del Feminismo en la República Dominicana is an important source for historians of feminism in the Dominican Republic.

== Early life and education ==
Livia María Veloz was born on September 11, 1892, to Juan Pablo Veloz and Adelina Echavarría. Her father was a stonemason and bricklayer. Veloz attended the Instituto de Señoritas, a teacher training college in Santo Domingo, graduating in 1913.

== Career ==
Along with Abigail Mejia, Veloz was a founding member of Club Nosotras (literally "our club"), a literary and cultural society for Dominican women. Veloz's first book of poetry, Preludios Sentimentales, was published in 1929 to positive reviews. In 1931, one of her sonnets received an honorable mention in a literary contest sponsored by the Azua Chamber of Commerce. She published another collection of poems in 1936, Accordes, which was also critically well received.

Veloz published the first volume of Libro Dominicano de Lectura, a primary school textbook, in 1939. At the time, the work was unique because Veloz wrote the entire book herself, rather than compiling excerpts from other source books. The Dominican National Council on Education selected it as a recommended textbook for primary school curricula. Veloz continued publishing new editions of the textbook for the next two decades. In 1964, the Secretary of State of Education awarded her the national Salomé Ureña prize for the fourth volume of Libro Dominicano de Lectura.

In 1940, a jury selected Veloz's novel La Más Chiquita to represent the Dominican Republic in a Farrar & Rinehart contest to find the best unpublished Latin American novel. Veloz received an honorable mention, but the book remained unpublished. It was eventually released posthumously in 1992 under the title Ojos Entreabiertos. Her final book of poetry, Transparencias, was published in 1971.

Veloz composed the school hymn for Colegio Serafín de Asís, a Franciscan school where her sister Sor Leticia Veloz was principal.

== Activism ==
On May 14, 1931, Club Nosotras reorganized into a new feminist organization, Acción Feminista Dominicana (Dominican Feminist Action, usually abbreviated as AFD). Veloz was a founding member. AFD's goals included women's suffrage, women's education, social well-being, and legal reforms for issues affecting women, such as alcoholism, prisons, and prenuptial agreements.

In 1932, Dominican president and dictator Rafael Trujillo publicly aligned himself with AFD by praising Veloz and other members of AFD as exemplary Dominican women. Historians and feminist scholars have debated the degree to which AFD was coerced into cooperation with Trujillo. On the one hand, Trujillo was courting domestic factions to preserve the regime's democratic and modernizing image on the international stage. AFD feminists likely viewed working with Trujillo's government as a strategic compromise, especially because he promised to consider granting women the right to vote. Activists from working-class backgrounds may have also felt economic pressure to cooperate. AFD feminists were given key roles as administrators and advisors in Trujillo's ruling party, particularly in social services. AFD operated eleven night schools for working class women, established a library in Santo Domingo, and distributed baby baskets to new mothers.

Veloz's role in AFD included coauthoring circulars, signing manifestos, and serving as a delegate for San Pedro de Macorís. She also was secretary of the Ibero-American Feminist Union. In 1934, Trujillo finally agreed to a referendum on women's suffrage but warned that his decision would depend on how many women turned out to vote. Veloz was very active in AFD's referendum campaign. She gave a speech in Santo Domingo in which she declared that "we fight not to surpass man, but to be equal to him. Companion always, slave never!" She also worked one of the polling stations for the historic election. Although 96,000 women voted and the vast majority supported suffrage, Trujillo was disappointed in the turnout and delayed further action until 1942.

After Trujillo's assassination in 1961, Veloz wrote a nonfiction book about the history of feminism in the Dominican Republic, particularly her experience as a member of AFD. It received a national literary prize while still unpublished. In 1977, it was published with the title Historia del Feminismo en la República Dominicana.

== Death and legacy ==
Veloz died on March 21, 1980, in Santo Domingo. She is considered a feminist pioneer in the Dominican Republic. Historia del Feminismo en la República Dominicana is an important source for feminist scholars and historians because it is a firsthand account of AFD and the feminist movement.
