= El Congreso de Pueblos de Habla Española =

El Congreso de Pueblos de Habla Española (the Spanish-Speaking Peoples' Congress), commonly referred to as El Congreso, was a coalition of Latino labor and civil rights activists based in the U.S. state of California that operated in the 1930s and 1940s. El Congreso's inaugural meeting on December 4, 1938, was spearheaded by Luisa Moreno in Los Angeles. It was attended by delegates from over 100 organizations, representing a combined membership of over 70,000 people. While other civil rights organizations focusing on Latinos in the United States emphasized Americanization, such as LULAC and the American GI Forum, El Congreso promoted a broad agenda of Latino unity that included immigrants living in the United States. In addition to welcoming non-citizens, El Congreso also distinguished itself from LULAC and the American GI Forum with its embrace of the working class. Although the goal of the founders was for the Congress to become a national organization, during its short existence it was most active and effective in California, with at least 10 branches operating in the greater Los Angeles Area. The organization declined in the mid-1940s under the pressure of FBI surveillance and suspicion of subversive activities.

== Platform ==
El Congreso aimed to improve labor conditions and civil rights for Latinos living in the United States, including citizens and immigrants alike. It supported a wide range of campaigns against racial oppression, including support for improving medical care, building federal housing, ensuring fair wages, and better education. Its emphasis, however, was on working-class people, and many of its leaders and members had close ties to other labor organizations such as the CIO and UCAPAWA. Resolutions called on workers to join unions, to unite regardless of differences in citizenship status, and to object forced deportations in light of the Depression Era practice of Repatriation. Members were encouraged to register to vote and to take active roles in electing candidates who fought for racial equality, and delegates were asked to keep an internationalist perspective that considered relations across Latin America. Questions still remain regarding the organization's relationship to the Communist Party.

=== Legislative campaigns ===
El Congreso played a central role in successfully opposing several pieces of legislation in California that it viewed as discriminatory against Mexicans or Mexican Americans. In 1939, El Congreso organized a march on the state capitol in Sacramento to oppose a bill known as “the Swing bill” which would have made it impossible for non-citizens to receive aid under many New Deal programs. Josefina Fierro de Bright met with Governor Olson, who ultimately vetoed the so-called “Swing bill”. El Congreso also opposed a failed bill in 1940 that aimed to deport non-citizens who received state welfare.

=== Housing efforts ===
El Congreso focused heavily on improving housing conditions for Mexican Americans in Los Angeles, which at the time were largely segregated, overcrowded, and rampant with diseases such as tuberculosis. In 1939, El Congreso launched a public housing campaign in Los Angeles that focused on neighborhood improvements such as electrification and drainage systems. They also pushed for access to public housing projects for Mexican American families. El Congreso framed this push for housing integration in the language of Americanism and Pan-Americanism, arguing that the U.S. Constitution guaranteed the right of Mexican American citizens to equal access of the housing projects funded by New Deal programs, and that a denial of this right reflected poorly on Roosevelt’s proclaimed Good Neighbor Policy towards Latin America. To take direct action on this matter, in November 1939 El Congreso hosted a public meeting as a forum where homeowners could discuss the ramifications of an impending federal housing project with state officials. The federal government sought to purchase homes in the largely Mexican districts of Maravilla Park and Ramona Gardens in Los Angeles to make room for the construction of new low-cost housing. With aid from El Congreso organizers, many Mexican American families (including some Mexican nationals with children who were U.S. citizens) were able to receive higher prices for their homes and were granted access to the new low-cost housing.

=== Educational efforts ===
In its educational platform, El Congreso advocated for bilingual education, increased opportunities for adult education with Spanish-speaking teachers, and institutionalizing the teaching of Mexican history and culture. The focus on implementing curriculums that included Mexican history, culture, and major contributions of Mexicans and Mexican Americans was designed to promote intercultural understanding and to fight racist stereotypes of Mexican inferiority. Some concrete educational advancements made by El Congreso included the hiring of more Mexican-American teachers in schools where the majority of students were ethnically Mexican, training sessions on Mexican-American culture for public school teachers, and funding scholarships for Mexican- American high school and college students. El Congreso was unsuccessful in its campaign for bilingual education in Los Angeles schools.

=== Women and El Congreso ===
While the importance of women to the foundation and successful operation of El Congreso is clear through the leadership roles of Luisa Moreno and Josefina Fierro de Bright, El Congreso set itself apart from other Mexican and Latino civil rights organizations of the time with its advocacy for women’s rights. Approximately 30% of El Congreso’s membership were women, and many held leadership positions besides Moreno and Fierro de Bright. At the second California state convention of El Congreso, it adopted a resolution on gender equality. The resolution acknowledged the double discrimination against Mexican and Mexican American women in the United States based on both their race and gender, and advocated the establishment of Women’s Committees within El Congreso branches to fight for equal wages and to increase voting registration and activity of Mexican American women.

== Leadership ==
El Congreso's driving force was Luisa Moreno. A seasoned union organizer, Moreno drew upon her extensive networks to form a national assembly. Josefina Fierro managed the day-to-day operations of the southern California chapters. Although the organization did not survive past the Cold War era, its leaders remained active in Latino campaigns throughout the 1960s.

- Luisa Moreno
- Josefina Fierro de Bright
- Eduardo Quevedo
- Bert Corona

== Ties to The Popular Front ==
Although no concrete ties have been found to link El Congreso with the Communist Party, it was modeled on similar principles to many organizations that comprised the far left leaning “Popular Front” coalition that fought against racial and class oppression. The structure and goals of El Congreso led many to believe that it was patterned after the National Negro Congress organized by the Communist Party in 1935. Besides these rumored ties to the Communist Party, El Congreso’s involvement with labor organizing and organizations such as the CIO led to increasing FBI scrutiny during WWII leading up to the anti-communist fervor of the 1950s.
