= Edna Acosta-Belén =

Puerto Rican academic

- Born: Puerto Rico
- Title: Distinguished Service Professor Emerita

Academic background
- Education: University of Puerto Rico; Columbia University (PhD)

Academic work
- Discipline: Latin American and Latino studies
- Institutions: State University of New York

Edna Acosta-Belén is a Puerto Rican-American scholar, author, and academic known for her contributions to Latin American, Caribbean, and U.S. Latino/a studies, with a particular focus on gender, culture, and migration. She is Distinguished Service Professor Emerita at the University at Albany, State University of New York, where she chaired the Department of Latin American, Caribbean, and U.S. Latino Studies and directed the Center for Latino, Latin American, and Caribbean Studies (CELAC).

== Early life and education ==
Edna Acosta-Belén was born in Puerto Rico and received her undergraduate education at the University of Puerto Rico. She later earned her Ph.D. in Latin American literature from Columbia University.

== Academic career ==
Acosta-Belén has held multiple academic and leadership roles at the University at Albany, where she played a significant part in institutionalizing Latin American and Latino studies programs. She served as Director of the Center for Latino, Latin American, and Caribbean Studies (CELAC) and held joint appointments in the departments of Latin American, Caribbean, and U.S. Latino Studies and Women's, Gender, and Sexuality Studies.

Her research has explored the intersections of gender, migration and identity within Puerto Rican, Caribbean and U.S. Latino/a contexts. She is a frequent contributor to edited volumes and academic journals addressing transnational feminisms and hemispheric studies.

== Recognition and impact ==
Acosta-Belén has been recognized for her work in promoting Latino/a and women's studies in academia. Her work has been widely cited in fields including sociology, political science, women's and gender studies, and Latin American and Caribbean studies.

Her scholarship has influenced both academic curricula and public discourse on Latino communities in the U.S. Northeast and beyond. In the mid-2000s, she contributed to public policy research, including the report "Unfinished Business: Latino and Other Faculty Diversity in the SUNY System," highlighting issues of equity in higher education.
