= A Dolores Huerta Reader =

2008 book by Mario T. Garcia

- Editor: Mario T. Garcia
- Author: Dolores Huerta
- Genre: Non-fiction
- Publisher: University of New Mexico Press
- Publication date: 2008

A Dolores Huerta Reader, edited by Mario T. Garcia, and published in 2008 by the University of New Mexico Press, is a book of compiled texts about activist and union leader Dolores Huerta. The book chronicles Huerta's work as an environmentalist, feminist, and leader of the United Farm Workers labor union; it also includes Huerta's perspective on the work she has done within her lifetime.

== Synopsis ==
The book is divided into an introduction and two sections. The introduction concisely summarizes Huerta's early years and involvement in the United Farm Workers. Part one is compiled of primary and secondary literature written about Huerta, including articles, book chapters, and journalistic pieces. Part two is autobiographical, and consisted of interviews, public statements, conference dialogues, and correspondence written by Huerta herself.

In chapter 18, Huerta shares the details of her path to community organizing; first working with the Community Service Organization (CSO) and later working with César Chávez and the United Farm Workers union in the first successful attempt to unionize farmworkers in the United States.

== Reception ==
A book review published in American Library Association Choice describes A Dolores Huerta Reader as "an interesting biographical work" and recommends it for all reading levels.

The Reader has been used as a text in coursework at the University of Wisconsin and Cuyamaca College.
