= Acción Feminista Dominicana =

Dominican women's organization

Acción Feminista Dominicana (AFD), was a feminist organization in the Dominican Republic. It was founded in 1931 as a reorganization of Club Nosotras, a literary and cultural club for Dominican women founded by Abigail Mejia and Livia Veloz. AFD's goals included women's suffrage, women's education, social well-being, and legal reforms for issues affecting women, including alcoholism, prisons, and prenuptial agreements.

In 1932, Dominican president and dictator Rafael Trujillo publicly aligned himself with AFD by praising Veloz and other members of AFD as exemplary Dominican women. Historians and feminist scholars have debated the degree to which AFD was coerced into cooperation with Trujillo. On the one hand, Trujillo was courting domestic factions to preserve the regime's democratic and modernizing image on the international stage. AFD feminists likely viewed working with Trujillo's government as a strategic compromise, especially because he promised to consider granting women the right to vote. Activists from working-class backgrounds may have also felt economic pressure to collaborate.

AFD feminists were given key roles as administrators and advisors in Trujillo's ruling party, particularly in social services. AFD operated eleven night schools for working-class women, established a library in Santo Domingo, and distributed baby baskets to new mothers. Beginning in 1932, AFD's agenda shifted in favor of campaigning for Trujillo's reelection.Trujillo used AFD in his propaganda to secure support for his regime among women, as well as to present a modern image of his regime, and "feminist" therefore came to be synonymous with "Trujillista" (female Trujillo-supporter) in the Dominican Republic.

In 1934, Trujillo finally agreed to a referendum on women's suffrage but warned that his decision would depend on how many women turned out to vote. AFD organized a rigorous campaign encouraging Dominican women to vote for their suffrage. Although 96,000 women voted and the vast majority supported suffrage, Trujillo was disappointed in the turnout and delayed further action until 1942.
