= Doris Stevens =

American suffragist (1888–1963)

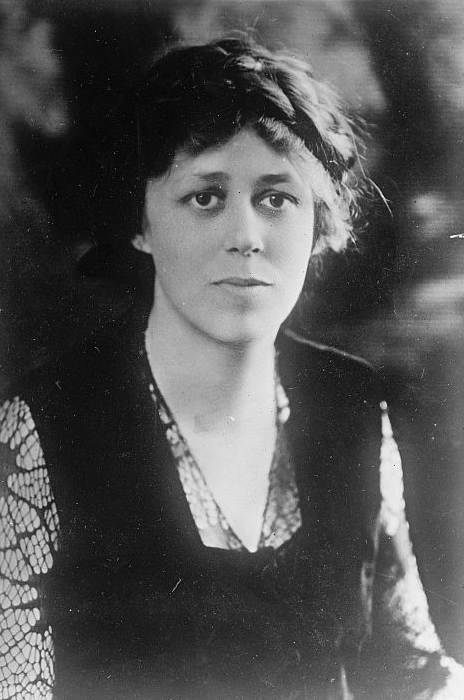
- Stevens, c. 1917-18
- Born: Dora Caroline Stevens; October 26, 1888; Omaha, Nebraska, US
- Died: March 22, 1963 (aged 74); New York City, US
- Education: Omaha High School
- Alma mater: Oberlin College
- Occupations: Suffragist, activist, author
- Years active: 1913–1963
- Known for: Suffragist, women's rights advocate
- Spouses: Dudley Field Malone (m. 1921; div. 1929) Jonathan Mitchell (m. 1935)

Doris Stevens (born Dora Caroline Stevens; October 26, 1888 – March 22, 1963) was an American suffragist, woman's legal rights advocate and author. She was the first female member of the American Institute of International Law and first chair of the Inter-American Commission of Women.

Born in 1888 in Omaha, Nebraska, Stevens became involved in the fight for suffrage while a college student at Oberlin College. After graduating with a degree in sociology in 1911, she taught briefly before becoming a paid regional organizer for the National American Woman Suffrage Association's Congressional Union for Woman Suffrage (CUWS). When the CUWS broke from the parent organization in 1914, Stevens became the national strategist. She was in charge of coordinating the women's congress, held at the Panama Pacific Exposition in 1915. When the CUWS became the National Woman's Party (NWP) in 1916, Stevens organized party delegates for each of the 435 Congressional Districts in an effort to attain national women's enfranchisement and defeat candidates who were opposed to women's rights. Between 1917 and 1919, Stevens was a prominent participant in the Silent Sentinels vigil at Woodrow Wilson's White House to urge the passage of a constitutional amendment for women's voting rights and was arrested several times for her involvement. After the 19th Amendment secured women's right to vote, she wrote a book, titled Jailed for Freedom (1920), which recounted the sentinel's ordeals.

Once the right to vote was secured, Stevens turned her attention to women's legal status. She supported passage of the Equal Rights Amendment and worked with Alice Paul from 1927 to 1933 on a volume of work comparing varying impact on law for women and men. The goal in compiling the data was to obtain an international law protecting women's right of citizenship. The research was completed with the help of feminists in 90 countries and evaluated laws controlling women's nationality from every country. Gaining approval for the work from the League of Nations in 1927, Stevens presented the proposal Pan American Union in 1928, convincing the governing body to create the Inter-American Commission of Women (CIM). In 1931, she joined the American Institute of International Law, becoming its first female member. In 1933, her work resulted in the first treaty to secure international rights for women. The Convention on the Nationality of Women established that women retained their citizenship after marriage and Convention on Nationality provided that neither marriage nor divorce could affect the nationality of the members of a family, extending citizenship protection to children.

Ousted from the CIM in 1938, and the NWP in 1947 over policy disputes, Stevens became vice president of the Lucy Stone League in 1951, of which she had been a member since the 1920s. She fought the roll-back of policies removing the gains women had made to enter the work force during World War II and worked to establish feminism as an academic field of study. She continued fighting for feminist causes until her death in 1963.

== Early life ==
Dora Caroline Stevens was born on October 26, 1888, in Omaha, Nebraska to Caroline D. (née Koopman) and Henry Henderbourck Stevens. Her father was a pastor of the Dutch Reformed Church for forty years and her mother was a first generation immigrant from Holland. One of four children, Stevens grew up in Omaha and graduated in 1905 from Omaha High School.

She went on to further her education graduating from Oberlin College in 1911 with a degree in sociology, though she had originally pursued music. While in college, she was known for her romances and for being a spirited suffragist. Her unruly behavior and disdain for feminine propriety were cultivated during her college years. After graduation, Stevens worked as a music teacher and social worker in Ohio, Michigan. and Montana before moving to Washington, D.C., where she became a regional organizer with the National American Woman Suffrage Association (NAWSA).

== Suffrage ==
In 1913, Stevens arrived in Washington to take part in the July picketing of the Senate. She did not plan to stay, but Alice Paul convinced her to do so. She was hired by the NAWSA, and was assigned to the newly formed Congressional Union for Woman Suffrage (CUWS), which had been created by Alice Paul and Mary Ritter Beard. At that time, the Congressional Union was a subdivision of the NAWSA, though it operated independently. Stevens was hired to serve as executive secretary in Washington, D. C., as well as serve as regional organizer and was assigned the eastern district. Paul had divided the nation into quadrants of twelve states each and assigned Stevens to the eastern area, Mabel Vernon to the middle west, Anne Martin to the far west, and Maud Younger to the south. The regional organizers were tasked with educating groups about the suffrage bills that were in Congress and garnering support from each state for ratifying national suffrage. Rather than follow the previous strategy of achieving enfranchisement on a state-by-state basis, the Congressional Union Strategy was full federal approval. This issue, caused a rift in the suffrage movement at the 1913 Convention, causing Paul and her supporters to break ties with the NAWSA and become an independent organization.

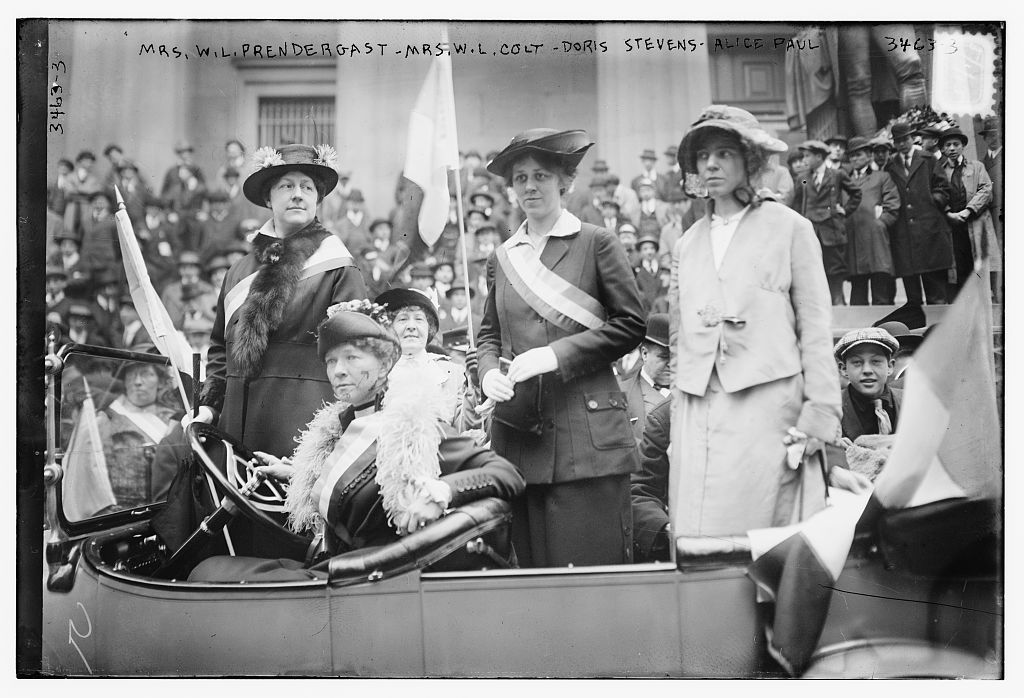
l to r: Mary Agnes Hull Prendergast, Elizabeth White Colt (driving), Doris Stevens, Alice Paul, April 30, 1915, en route to visit New York Senator James O'Gorman

With the fissure, the Congressional Union began a reorganization to push for campaigns against Democratic candidates because they had not supported suffrage while they were in control of the legislature. Paul established an all-woman advisory council of suffrage workers and prominent women which included Bertha Fowler, Charlotte Perkins Gilman, Helen Keller, Belle Case La Follette, May Wright Sewall and educators such as Emma Gillett, Maria Montessori, and Clara Louise Thompson, a Latin Professor at Rockford College, among others, to lend credibility to the new organization. Stevens became the national organizer, charged with organizing women in states in which they were able to vote to use their ballots and oppose any candidate not in favor of full enfranchisement of women. One of the first places Stevens traveled to was Colorado, where CUWS was successful in attaining commitment from one congressman to support the women's cause. Returning from that success in January 1915, she went to New York City and Newport, Rhode Island to campaign before heading west. She campaigned in Kansas, hoping to secure delegates for a convention planned in San Francisco for September.

Arriving in California in June, Stevens accompanied a group of women led by Charlotte Anita Whitney to meet with House Appropriations Committee members who were meeting at the Palace Hotel, in San Francisco. The women had been assured that they would be able to present their issues, but the chair, Representative John J. Fitzgerald of New York, refused to allow it. Undaunted, Whitney and Stevens continued their planning efforts for the Panama Pacific Exposition CUWS Congress in San Francisco. In San Francisco at the CUWS headquarters in 1915, Stevens discussed the strategy of employing a "million-vote smile", positing that smiling was a useful tool in the fight to win over men's support. "Smile on men and they will give you a vote. Look severe and they won't," she stated. However, when Alice Paul arrived two weeks before the event, she canceled choral events, a parade and a mass meeting that had been planned for the Scottish Rite Hall. Stevens had been involved in supervising each of these events, though local women planned and orchestrated them. Paul did keep the luncheon and a ball to be held at the California building of the exposition. After the September Congress, Stevens had planned to remain in San Francisco and run the exposition booth of CUWS, but she was forced to return to Washington because the eastern delegate Margaret Whittemore had left due to her marriage. Stevens immediately began planning for a convention to be held in Washington in December.

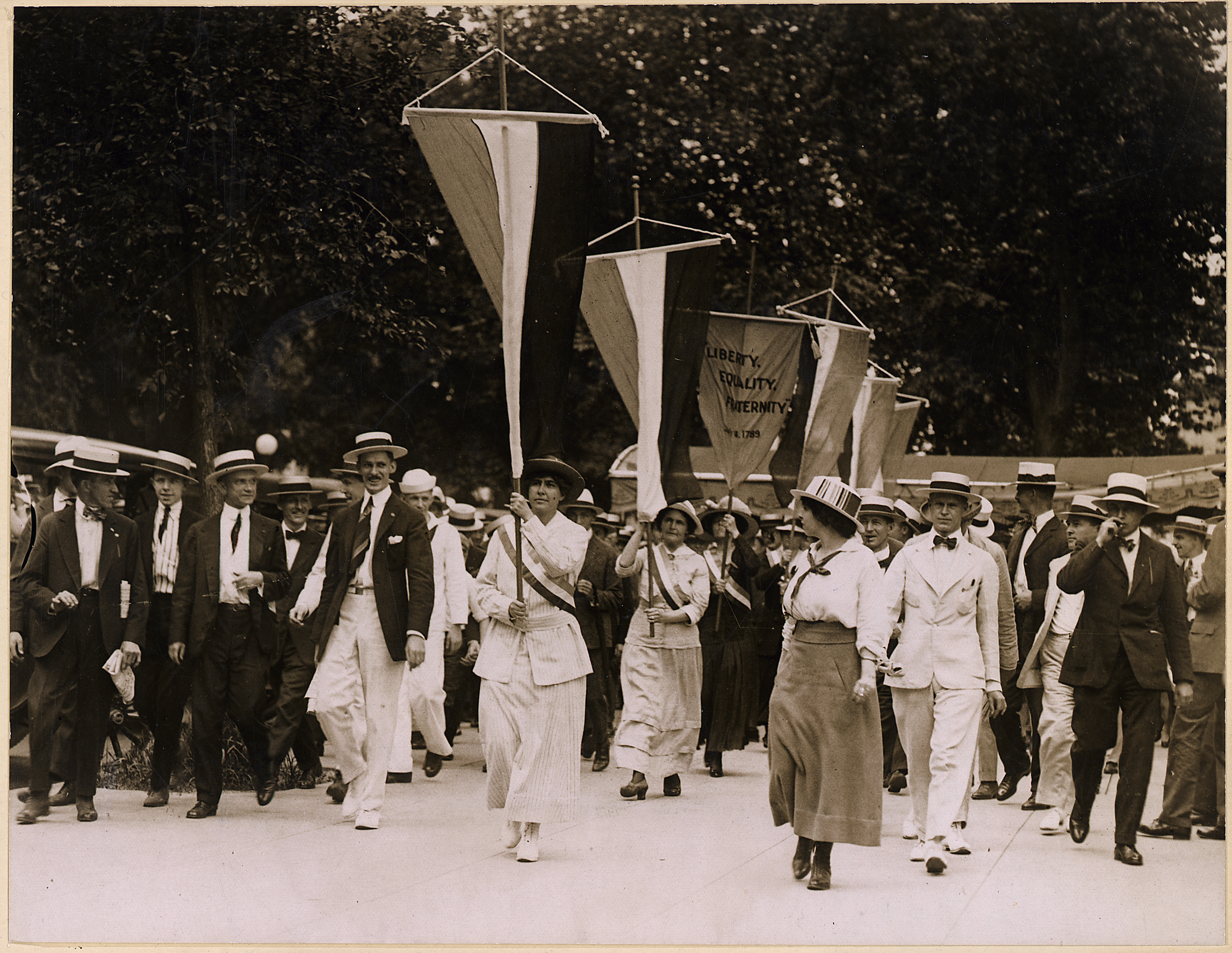
Julia Hurlbut of Morristown, New Jersey, leading the sixteen members of the National Woman's Party who participated in the Bastille Day picketing demonstration in front of the White House, July 14, 1917, which led to their arrest

At the beginning of 1916, Stevens announced the policy that the CUWS had organized in twenty-two states and planned on recruiting delegates for each of the 435 House Districts. The delegates were required to form committees to press Congressional Members to favor suffrage and make them aware that their constituents were in favor of women attaining the vote. Another strategy Stevens began implementing early in 1916 required CUWS members to go to other states in which women were allowed to vote, establish residence and register to vote. In this way, they could vote in state and national elections in the hope of filling the legislature with legislators who favored suffrage. Stevens registered to vote in Kansas that year. On June 5, 1916, the CUWS became the National Woman's Party (NWP), having a single platform to acquire a constitutional amendment for national women's suffrage. After attending the NWP convention in Chicago in June, Stevens headed to a convention in Colorado. By October, Stevens was organizing and managing the NWP election campaign in California.

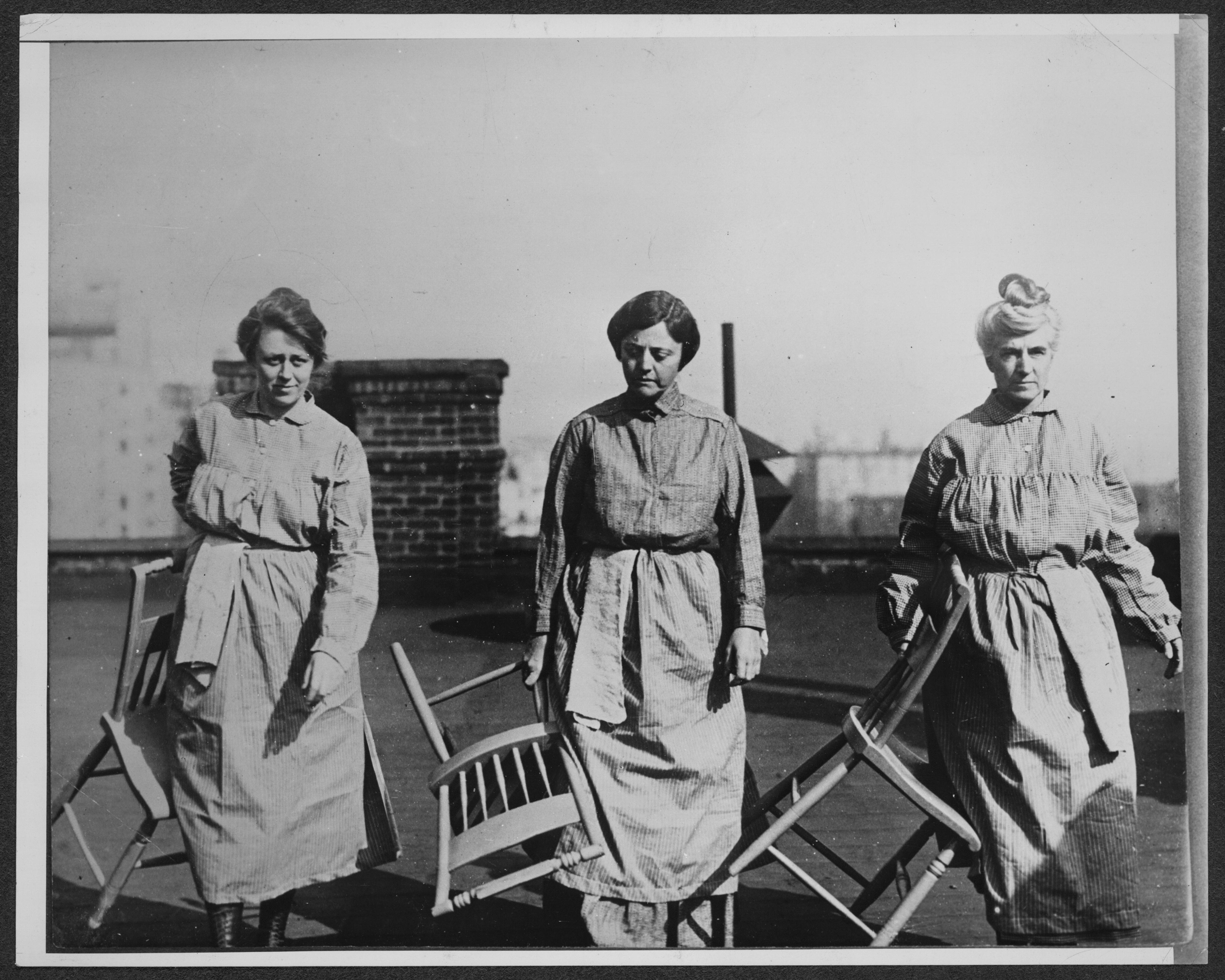
National Woman's Party members in prison dress carrying wooden chairs, on rooftop of building. (Left to right): Doris Stevens, Alison Turnbull Hopkins, and Eunice Dana Brannan, 1919

=== Arrest ===
Due to the United States' entry into World War I, some suffragists stopped their activism in 1917 because it might be seen as "unpatriotic;" Stevens, instead, insisted that it was "arrogant of Wilson to fight for democracy abroad when women were not included in democracy at home." In January after a delegation of NWP members had a disappointing meeting with President Woodrow Wilson, it was decided that they would protest at the White House every day, standing as Silent Sentinels until Wilson recognized the importance of their cause. The women maintained their post for over a year disregarding weather conditions and the threat of arrest. Though she performed other organizational tasks, such as organizing the North Carolina branch of the NWP in March, Stevens participated as a sentinel. She and fifteen other women were arrested for picketing at the White House on Bastille Day, in July 1917, charged with obstructing the sidewalk, and served three days of their 60-day sentence at Occoquan Workhouse before receiving a pardon from President Wilson. The women were placed within the prison population, given no toothbrushes, combs or toiletries and were surprised that they were required to share a water dipper with the rest of the prisoners.

Stevens met her first husband, Dudley Field Malone, when he represented her for her protest in front of the White House. He had been serving as an Assistant Secretary of State in the Wilson cabinet, but was converted to the suffragist cause and resigned his post. He appeared with Stevens at fundraising events and helped raise thousands of dollars for their cause, which was gaining momentum, as President Wilson finally endorsed enfranchisement. Between 1918 and 1919, Stevens continued alternating speaking engagements and picketing. She was arrested again, along with Elsie Hill, Alice Paul and three "Jane Doe" suffragists at the NWP demonstration of the Metropolitan Opera House in New York in March 1919. On September 4, 1920, the fight was won when Secretary of State Bainbridge Colby proclaimed the necessary 36 states had ratified the 19th Amendment with Tennessee's ratification. Stevens published the quintessential insider account of the imprisonment of NWP activists, Jailed for Freedom, in 1920.

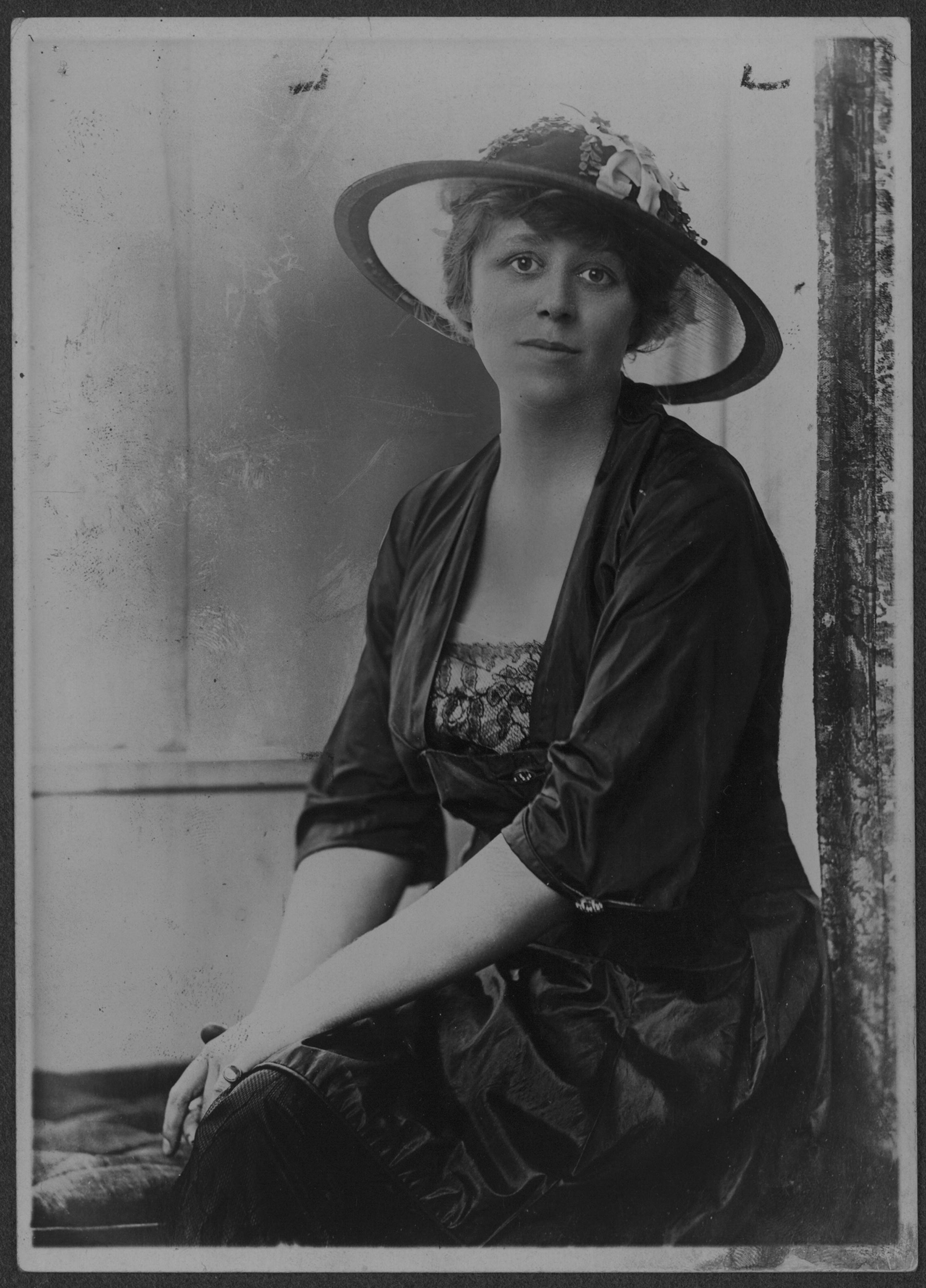
Doris Stevens, 1919 Legislative Chairman, National Woman's Party

Over the years, Stevens held several important NWP leadership positions, including Legislative Chairman and membership on the executive committee. In 1920, Alva Belmont was elected president of the NWP and Stevens served as Belmont’s personal assistant, even writing Belmont's autobiography. Belmont and Steven's relationship was contentious, but the younger Stevens accepted years of control by Belmont over many of her personal actions. Traveling to Europe with Belmont for work of the NWP, Belmont insisted that Steven's fiancé could not join them and when he did, Belmont removed to France without Stevens.

On December 5, 1921, in Peekskill, New York, Stevens and Malone were secretly married by a hardware store owner who was a Justice of the Peace and immediately sailed for their two-month honeymoon in Paris. Stevens announced she would not take Malone's name and would remain "Doris Stevens". From the middle of the 1920s, Stevens lived primarily in Croton-on-Hudson, New York, where she became friends with leading members of the Greenwich Village radical scene and bohemians, including Louise Bryant, Max and Crystal Eastman, Edna St. Vincent Millay, John Reed and others. Stevens divorced Malone in 1929 after a string of infidelities on both sides and failed attempts at reconciliation.

== Equality activism ==
The focus of the NWP shifted to equality under the law, including equal employment opportunities, jury service, nationality for married women and any other provision which legally prohibited women from having full legal equality. In 1923, the Equal Rights Amendment was introduced by Daniel Read Anthony, Jr. and the women pushed for its passage, lobbying for support from both political parties. Stevens served as vice chair of NWP’s New York branch, spearheading the NWP Women for Congress campaign in 1924. Unable to run herself due to her having established a legal residence in France, Stevens worked toward the goal of securing the election of 100 women to Congress in states where female candidates were among contenders for office. The campaign had negligible results and the women shifted back to equality measures. Beginning in 1926, one of the proposals Stevens focused on for the next several years was the "Wages for Wives" marriage contract. Campaigning vigorously for its adoption, the "Wages for Wives" proposal called for a flexible contract which split marital assets 50-50 rather than treating married couples as a single entity and called for women to be paid a wage for domestic services and raising children as a protection for children's continuous support.

From the end of the War, a growing belief among women's organizations was the notion that all women faced similar problems as subordinates to men and that combining their interests might lead to gains. At the International Council of Women (ICW) conference held in Washington in 1925, the sentiment was expressed by Lady Aberdeen, welcoming all women to the "sisterhood, of whatever creed, party, section or class they may belong". In 1927, Stevens and Alice Paul undertook a massive study of how laws affected women's nationality; studying for example, if they lost their nationality by marrying or even became stateless. Stevens met with feminists throughout Europe and held public meetings to gather data, including Dr. Luisa Baralt of Havana, Dr. Ellen Gleditsch of Oslo, Chrystal Macmillan and Sybil Thomas, Viscountess Rhondda of the UK, the Marquesa del Ter of Spain, Maria Vérone of France and Hélène Vacaresco of Romania, as well as various officers of the International Federation of University Women and others. Paul reviewed the laws of each country. Together, they compiled a monumental report, which indexed all laws controlling women's nationality from every country in its native language and then translated each law on an accompanying page. Tables were provided for easy comparison and a synopsis of the laws was given. The report was initially prepared for a meeting that was to take place at the League of Nations in 1930 to discuss codification of international laws. Stevens felt that nationality of women should be included in that discussion and spearheaded the research, believing "feminism should strive for equal rights for women, and that women should be considered first and foremost as human beings." In September 1927, she attended a preliminary meeting of the League of Nations in Geneva and obtained their unanimous support of her proposal. She continued meeting with women and gathering data until January 1928, when she attended the Pan-American Conference in Havana. Stevens convinced the governing body of the Pan American Union to create the Inter-American Commission of Women (Spanish: Comisión Interamericana de Mujeres) (CIM) on April 4, 1928.

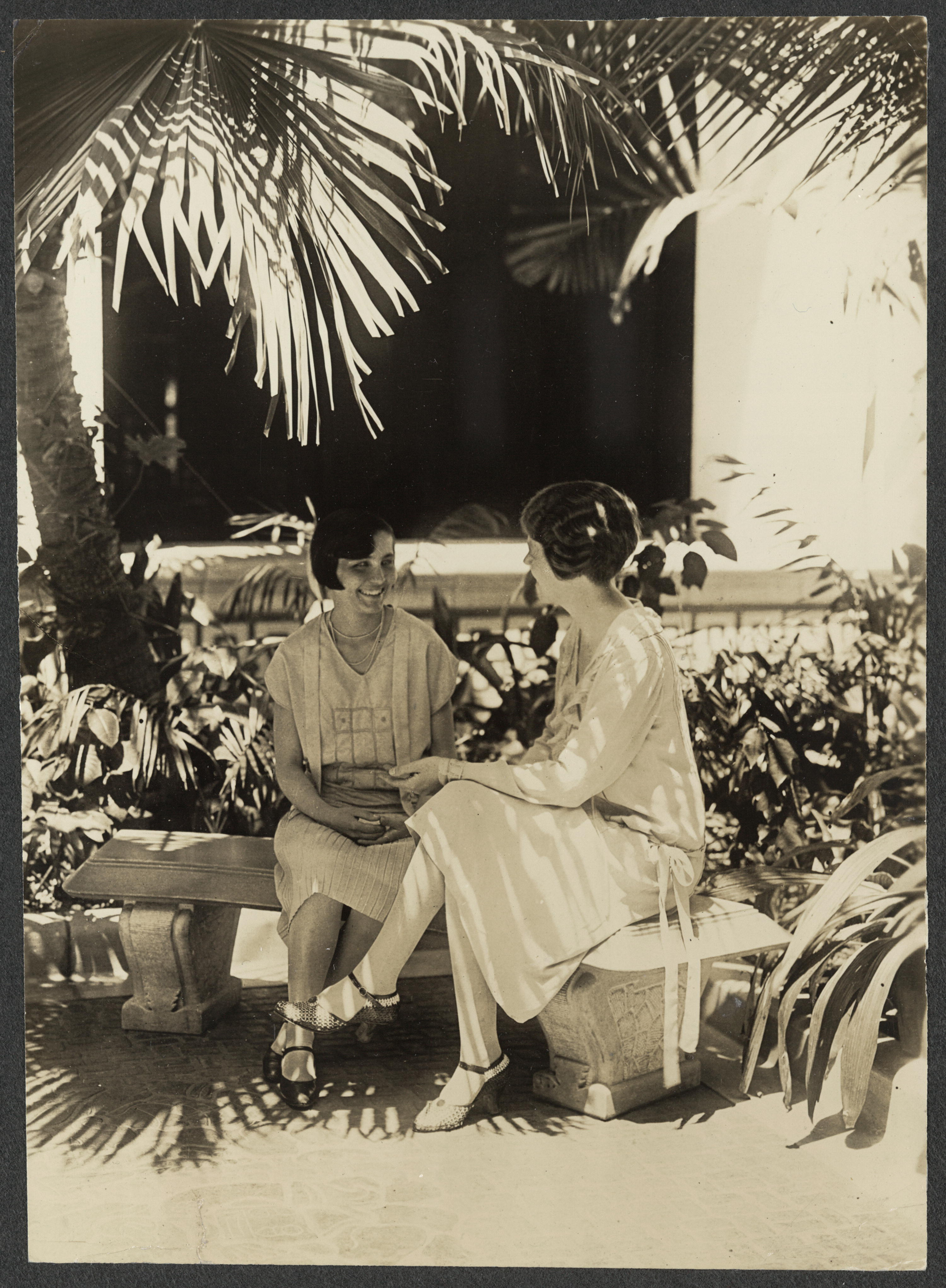
Doris Stevens, right, talking to Sra. Clara González at the Pan-American Conference of Havana, January 1928

The initial Inter-American Commission of Women (CIM) was made up of seven women delegates who were charged with finalizing the report for the next Pan-American Conference (1933) to review civil and political equality for women. Stevens served as chair of the CIM from its creation in 1928 until her ouster in 1938. By August, Stevens was back in Paris working on the report. She and other suffragists picketed the French president, Gaston Doumergue, in 1928 in an attempt to get the world peace delegates to support an equal rights treaty. They were dismissively described by a journalist who did cover the event as "militant suffragettes," and a Paris paper called the protest "an amusing incident." Though arrested, they were released upon providing proof of their identities.

In 1929, Stevens returned to the United States and began to study law, taking classes at the American University and Columbia University in international law and foreign policy. In 1930, she returned to Havana in February for the first meeting of the CIM women which included Flora de Oliveira Lima (Brazil), Aída Parada (Chile), Lydia Fernández (Costa Rica), Elena Mederos de González (Cuba), Gloria Moya de Jiménez (Dominican Republic), Irene de Peyré (Guatemala), Margarita Robles de Mendoza (Mexico), Juanita Molina de Fromen (Nicaragua), Clara González (Panama), Teresa Obregoso de Prevost (Peru). From Cuba, she went to The Hague for the first World Conference on the Codification of International Law held on March 13. Presenting her data on what had been accomplished in the Americas, Stevens asked that the international community enact laws to protect women's citizenship. She returned to the United States and her studies. Though she didn't graduate, in 1931 she became the first woman member of the American Institute of International Law. That same year, she, Belmont and Paul attended the League of Nations meeting in September to present their nationality findings.

=== Seventh Pan-American Conference ===
Stevens was very active in working with Latin American feminists through the CIM, even though focused on pursuing her own interests over the concerns of many Latin American feminists. Historian Katherine Marino describes in Feminism for the Americas (2019) how Stevens refused to fund conference travel for fellow Latin American CIM members like Clara Gonzalez and effectively sidelined the well-known and respected Uruguayan feminist Paulina Luisi from the CIM. At the Seventh Pan-American Conference, held in 1933 in Montevideo, Uruguay, the women presented their analysis of the legal status of women in each of the 21 member countries. The first report ever to study in detail the civil and political rights of women, it had been prepared solely by women. They proposed a Treaty on the Equality of Rights for Women, and it was rejected by the conference, though it was signed by Cuba, Ecuador, Paraguay, and Uruguay. Three of those states had already granted suffrage to women, and none of the four ratified the Treaty after the conference. However, the women had presented the first international resolution to recommend suffrage for women. Next, Stevens presented their materials which showed the disparity between rights of men and women. For example, in 16 countries of the Americas women could not vote at all, in two countries they could vote with restrictions, and in three countries they had equal enfranchisement. In 19 of the American countries, women did not have equal custody over their children, including in seven US states, and only two countries allowed joint authority for women of their own children. None of the Latin American countries allowed women to serve on juries, and 27 US states prohibited women from participating in juries. Divorce grounds in 14 countries and 28 states were disparate for men and women, and a woman could not administer her own separate property in 13 countries and two US states.

After reviewing the data, the conference approved the first international agreement ever adopted on women's rights. The Convention on the Nationality of Women made it clear that should a woman marry a man of a different nationality, her citizenship could be retained. The text stated, "there shall be no distinction based on sex as regards nationality". The conference also passed the Convention on Nationality, which established that neither marriage nor divorce could affect the nationality of the members of a family, extending citizenship protection to children as well. The Roosevelt administration, hoping to get rid of Stevens, then argued that the women's task was completed and the CIM should be abandoned. Not wanting to bow to US pressure, the Conference did not vote to continue the CIM, but instead voted as a unit, with the exception of Argentina, to block the US proposal.

=== Later career ===
It would take FDR another five years, with the help of the League of Women Voters to replace Stevens. Making the argument that Stevens was appointed by the Conference of the Pan-American States and not as a U.S. delegate, FDR agreed to give permanent status to the CIM, if each state was allowed to appoint their own delegates. Securing approval, he then immediately replaced Stevens with Mary Nelson Winslow. Stevens did not go quietly and the clash continued throughout 1939 with Eleanor Roosevelt backing Winslow and suffragists backing Stevens. Eleanor's objection to Stevens was multi-faced, in that she did not think that the Equal Rights Amendment would protect women and on a personal level, she believed Stevens behaved in an unladylike manner.

In 1940, Stevens was elected to serve on the National Council of the National Woman's Party. The following year, when Alice Paul returned from a two-year trip to Switzerland to establish the World Woman’s Party (WWP), difficulties arose. Paul experienced both challenges to the direction she was taking the NWP and had personality conflicts with members, including Stevens. When Alva Belmont died in 1933, the bequest she had promised Stevens for years of personal service was instead directed to the NWP. Stevens sued the estate, eventually receiving US$12,000, but she believed that Paul had sabotaged her relationship with Belmont. After Paul's resignation in 1945, Stevens did not support Paul's hand-selected replacement, Anita Pollitzer and led an unsuccessful attempt to challenge her leadership. Pollitzer was seen as a figurehead for Paul and an internal dispute arose over the NWP’s emphasis on the WWP and international rights rather than domestic organizing. During these tensions, a dissenting faction of NWP members tried to take over party headquarters and elect their own slate of officers, but Pollitzer’s claim to leadership was supported by a ruling of a federal district judge.

Stevens parted ways with the NWP in 1947 and turned instead to activity in the Lucy Stone League, a women’s rights organization based on Lucy Stone's retention of her maiden name after marriage. After World War II ended, the organization was revived in 1950 because the rights women had seen surge during the war were reverting to their pre-war state. Stevens was one of the reorganizers along with Freda Kirchwey, Frances Perkins and others. Stevens had long been a proponent of a woman retaining her own name and did not take her husband's name in either of her marriages. She had remarried to Jonathan Mitchell on August 31, 1935, in Portland, Maine. Mitchell was a reporter for The New Republic during the Roosevelt years and later for the National Review, and was an anti-communist. He took part in the McCarthy hearings and Stevens, after her marriage to him, moved politically to the right, from her previously socialist leanings.

From 1951 to 1963, Stevens served as vice-president of the Lucy Stone League, though she struggled with maintaining militancy. In her last years, Stevens supported the establishment of feminist studies as a legitimate field of academic inquiry in American universities and tried to establish a Lucy Stone Chair of Feminism at Radcliffe College.

Stevens died on March 22, 1963, in New York City, two weeks after having a stroke.

== Legacy ==
In 1986, Princeton University established an endowed chair in women’s studies through the Doris Stevens Foundation.

In 2004, the film Iron Jawed Angels was made about the early days of the suffrage movement. Doris Stevens was portrayed by Laura Fraser.

Shaina Taub began developing the musical Suffs in the early 2010s, after she read Jailed for Freedom by Doris Stevens. Stevens and her first husband serve as supporting characters in the show.

== Selected works ==
- Stevens, Doris (1919). The militant campaign. Washington, D.C.: The National Woman's Party. OCLC 71644630.
- Stevens, Doris (1920). Jailed for Freedom. New York, New York: Boni and Liveright. OCLC 574971418.
- Stevens, Doris (1928). L'Egalité des droits pour les femmes par Convention Internationale: Discours prononcé à la session plénière non-officielle de la 6ème conférence Pan-Américaine. Pan-American Conference publication (in French). Washington, D.C.: The National Woman's Party. OCLC 758520361.
- Stevens, Doris (1933). Tribute to Alva Belmont: late president of the National Woman's Party. Washington, D.C.: Inter American Commission of Women, Pan American Union. OCLC 731402801.
- Stevens, Doris (1934). History of equal rights treaty signed at the VII International Conference of American States by Uruguay, Paraguay, Ecuador and Cuba. Washington, D.C.: Inter American Commission of Women, Pan American Union. OCLC 827304625.
- Stevens, Doris (1936). A comparison of the political and civil rights of men and women in the United States : statement interpreting the laws of the United States ... and presented for action by the 7th International Conference of American States. Washington, D.C.: U.S. Government Printing Office. OCLC 276997382.
- Stevens, Doris (1936). En prison pour la liberté! Comment nous avons conquis le vote des femmes aux États-Unis (in French). Paris, France: A. Pedone. OCLC 9513999.
- Stevens, Doris (1940). Paintings & drawings of Jeannette Scott. Mount Vernon, New York: Privately printed for James Brown Scott. OCLC 423924981.

== See also ==
- List of suffragists and suffragettes
- List of women's rights activists
- Timeline of women's suffrage
- Women's suffrage organizations
