= Juanita Molina de Fromen =

Nicaraguan educator and feminist

- Juanita Molina de Fromen, from a 1930 publication.
- Born: 1893; Managua
- Died: December 22, 1934 (aged 40–41); New York City
- Occupation: Educator

Juanita Molina de Fromen (1893 – 22 December 1934) was a Nicaraguan educator and feminist. She was one of the delegates to the Inter-American Commission of Women in 1930.

== Early life and education ==
Juanita Molina was born in 1893 in Managua, Nicaragua. After completing her primary and secondary education in Managua, she became Principal of the Municipal School. Continuing her education, she attended the College of the Holy Names in Oakland, California and went on to earn both a Bachelor of Arts and Master of Arts from Columbia University.

== Career ==
Molina returned to Nicaragua and in 1924 was appointed Assistant Secretary of Public Instruction. She married fellow teacher Gunnar Fromen and returned to New York, where she was teaching Spanish classes in 1926 at such institutions as the Curtis Superior School and Hunter College High School in New York City. In 1929, she and her husband were both contracted to work for the government of Nicaragua studying schooling systems in the US. Molina was contracted as an educational advisor and her husband as an instructor.

In 1930, Molina was appointed by President José María Moncada as the Nicaraguan delegate to the Inter-American Commission of Women. The purpose of the delegation was to compile a report indicating how laws in the various countries of the Americas effected women's nationality. The members for the 1930 Havana meeting were Flora de Oliveira Lima (Brazil), Aída Parada (Chile), Lydia Fernández (Costa Rica), Elena Mederos de González (Cuba), Gloria Moya de Jiménez (Dominican Republic), Irene de Peyré (Guatemala), Margarita Robles de Mendoza (Mexico), Juanita Molina de Fromen (Nicaragua), Clara González (Panama), Teresa Obregoso de Prevost (Peru), and Doris Stevens (USA). As their governments provided no funding for their attendance, only the women from Cuba, the Dominican Republic, Nicaragua, Panama, the United States were able to attend. Molina was unable to attend the 1933 Montevideo Convention, because once again her government provided no funds; however, both she and her husband had contributed information on the laws of Nicaragua pertaining to women.

Molina and her husband were active suffragists and worked with President Molina on a constitutional amendment to enfranchise women, which was submitted to the Chamber of Deputies and Senate in 1930, but the effort failed. She continued to fight from New York for the right to vote for Nicaraguan women until her untimely death.

== Health issues and death ==
Molina suffered from a series of health issues in 1934. She underwent two appendix operations and had a mental break due to severe postpartum depression, which was revealed in a letter to Doris Stevens from Gunnar. As a result, she committed infanticide on her only child and died as a result of suicide on 22 December 1934 in the couple's New York City apartment.

== Sources ==
- González-Rivera, Victoria; Kampwirth, Karen (2010). Radical Women in Latin America: Left and Right. Penn State Press. ISBN 978-0-271-04247-3.
- González-Rivera, Victoria (2011). Before the Revolution: Women's Rights and Right-wing Politics in Nicaragua, 1821-1979. Penn State Press. ISBN 978-0-271-04870-3.
- Seminar on Feminism and Culture in Latin America (1990). Women, culture, and politics in Latin America. Berkeley, California: University of California Press. ISBN 978-0-520-90907-6.
