= Lidia Fernández =

Costa Rican feminist

- Born: Lidia Fernández Jiménez; Costa Rica
- Died: Costa Rica

Lidia Fernández Jiménez (also often spelled Lydia Fernández) was a Costa Rican suffragist and feminist active between 1920 and 1940 in the struggle for women's right to vote.

In 1923, Mexican feminist Elena Arizmendi Mejia who was living in New York and publishing a magazine Feminismo Internacional (International Feminism) invited women all over the world to create subsidiaries of the International League of Iberian and Latin American Women on 12 October of that year. As a result, Ángela Acuña Braun called together a group to found the Liga Feminista Costarricense (LFC), first feminist organization in Costa Rica. The inaugural members were Acuña (president), Esther De Mezerville (vice president), Ana Rosa Chacón (secretary), and Fernández, along with around 20 others. In 1926, Acuña went to Europe and Fernández succeeded her as president of the LFC.

In 1928, when the Pan-American Conference met and established the Inter-American Commission of Women (CIM) an international group of women pressured Costa Rica to send Fernández as the delegate, but instead the country sent Alejandro Aguilar Machado, who did agree to the creation of the CIM. The first meeting of the CIM was held in Havana in 1930. The members were, Flora de Oliveira Lima (Brazil), Aída Parada (Chile), Lidia Fernández (Costa Rica), Elena Mederos de González (Cuba), Gloria Moya de Jiménez (Dominican Republic), Irene de Peyré (Guatemala), Margarita Robles de Mendoza (Mexico), Juanita Molina de Fromen (Nicaragua), Clara González (Panama), Teresa Obregoso de Prevost (Peru), and Doris Stevens (USA).

In 1934, the LFC called together a commission to meet with legislative delegates. The commission was made up of educated professional women from law, sociology, education, fine arts and health professionals who made presentations to convince the legislators that the lack of civic and political rights had severe consequences for women. Fernández was part of the committee that prepared the report on health and hygiene. Despite agreeing that lack of rights impacted women, the legislators took no action. In 1938, Fernández resigned from the CIM, after serving eight years and was replaced by Acuña.
