= Aída Parada =

Chilean educator and feminist

- Aída Parada, from a 1930 publication
- Born: October 1903; Linares, Chile
- Died: 16 October 1983 (aged 79–80); Santiago, Chile
- Occupations: Educator, feminist

Aída Parada Hernández (October 1903 – 16 October 1983) was a Chilean educator, feminist, founding member of Movimiento Pro-Emancipación de las Mujeres de Chile (Pro-Emancipation Movement of Chilean Women) and the first Chilean delegate to the Inter-American Commission of Women.

== Biography ==
Aída Parada Hernández was born in October 1903 in Linares, Chile to Juan Parada and his wife Margarita Hernández. She completed her primary and secondary education in Linares and then attended the Talca Normal School between 1919 and 1924, earning a teaching degree. (Note: Blog author is a professor and physician. Has taught at Universidad Complutense de Madrid, USACH, and Universidad de Chile) She also founded a school in Linares for adult education. After receiving a master's degree from the Talca Normal School, she taught at her alma mater for 3 years. Then in 1930, she received a fellowship to study at Columbia University in Manhattan and completed both a Bachelor of Science and a Master of Arts before returning home to Chile.

After the 1928 founding of the Inter-American Commission of Women, the women decided to meet every two years, in addition to meeting for the scheduled Pan-American Conferences to foster ongoing unity and continuity. As such, the first meeting was held in Havana in 1930. The members were Flora de Oliveira Lima (Brazil), Aída Parada (Chile), Lydia Fernández (Costa Rica), Elena Mederos de González (Cuba), Gloria Moya de Jiménez (Dominican Republic), Irene de Peyré (Guatemala), Margarita Robles de Mendoza (Mexico), Juanita Molina de Fromen (Nicaragua), Clara González (Panama), Teresa Obregoso de Prevost (Peru), and Doris Stevens (USA). As their governments provided no funding for their attendance, only the women from Cuba, the Dominican Republic, Nicaragua, Panama, the United States and delegates from Alicia Ricode de Herrera (Colombia), MMe Fernand Dennis (Haiti), El Salvador by proxy and Cecilia Herrera de Olavarría (Venezuela) were there.

In 1935, a group of Chilean women, who like Parada had studied abroad, got together and founded the Pro-Emancipation Movement of Chilean Women (Spanish: Movimiento Pro-Emancipación de las Mujeres de Chile). Among others, the founders included: Elena Caffarena, Flora Heredia, Evangelina Matte, Graciela Mandujano, Aída Parada, Olga Poblete, María Ramírez, Eulogia Román, Marta Vergara and Clara Williams de Yunge. Their goals were to address the social prejudices that curtailed women's equality in the labor market and to introduce women's voices into national politics on matters concerning biology, economics, judicial, and political rights for women. Between 1935 and 1952, she was one of the core feminists working with MEMCH and representing Chile at international meetings and conferences.

She was teaching at the Pedagogic Institute (now the Metropolitan University of Educational Sciences Spanish: Universidad Metropolitana de Ciencias de la Educación) in the faculty of philosophy and education, when in 1947, Parada was named as a professor of the Department of Technical Assessment at the University of Chile. In 1948, she was briefly married to León Chamúdez, but they were separated within a year. She continued teaching until her retirement in June 1973.

Parada died in Santiago, Chile on 16 October 1983.

== Sources ==
- Egaña Baraona, María Loreto; Núñez P., Iván; Salinas, Cecilia (2003). La educación primaria en Chile, 1860-1930: una aventura de niñas y maestras. LOM Ediciones. ISBN 978-956-282-505-4.
- Lavrin, Asuncion (1998). Women, Feminism, and Social Change in Argentina, Chile, and Uruguay, 1890-1940. U of Nebraska Press. ISBN 0-8032-7973-6.
- Seminar on Feminism and Culture in Latin America (1990). Women, culture, and politics in Latin America. Berkeley, California: University of California Press. ISBN 978-0-520-90907-6.
