= Rocío García =

Rocío García may refer to:

- Rocío García Gaytán (1959–2015), Mexican politician
- Rocío García Olmedo (born 1957), Mexican politician
- Rocío del Alba García (born 1997), Spanish road cyclist and mountain biker
- Rocío Nahle García (born 1964), Mexican politician and petrochemical engineer
