= Oliveira Lima Library =

Coordinates: 38°55′58.7″N 76°59′52.0″W

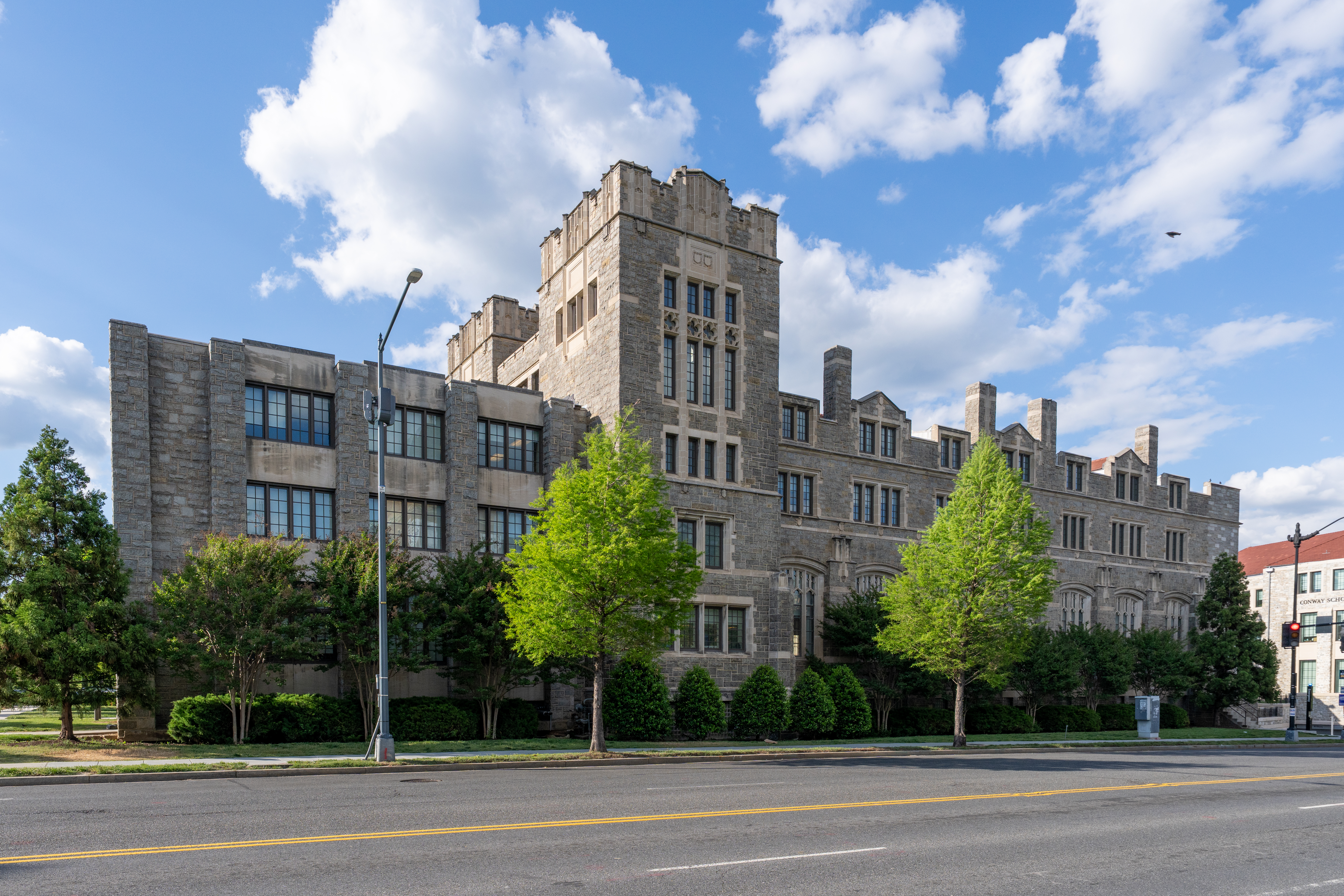
Oliveira Lima Library (2026)

The Oliveira Lima Library (also known as the Ibero American Library) is located at the Catholic University of America in Washington, DC. It was founded in 1916, when Brazilian diplomat and scholar Manoel de Oliveira Lima and his wife, Flora de Oliveira Lima officially donated their private library to the university after obtaining an agreement that the library would remain a separate, autonomous facility and that Manoel would be the first librarian. The initial collection included 40,000 volumes of books primarily focused on colonial Portuguese Brazilian history, literature and culture. Many of the rare books are original sources, on Portuguese philology and etymology, which complement the other volumes in the collection.

== History ==
After establishing the library and setting it up, it opened in 1924 with Manoel serving as librarian until his death in 1928. Upon his death, Flora took over managing the collection. Under her direction, the collection grew to 58,000 volumes.

In addition, it contains around 200,000 pages of correspondence; 6 dozen albums of newspaper clippings of the couple’s various diplomatic posts which included Lisbon, Berlin, Washington, DC, London, Tokyo, Caracas, Brussels and Stockholm; and around 600 works of art including engravings, maps, paintings, sculptures and watercolors. Some of the artwork includes a landscape of Pernambuco painted by Dutch artist Frans Post (1612-1680); a screen showing the Largo do Machado in Rio de Janeiro by Nicolas-Antoine Taunay (1755-1830); a bronze bust of Pedro I by sculptor Marc Ferrez (1788-1850); the only existing color copy of Rerum per Octenium in Brasilia by Gaspar Barleus (1584-1648); the first book in French about Brazil, La Singularité de la France Anthartique, by Franciscan priest André Thévet (1502-1590), among many others.

=== Digitizing project ===
In a digitizing project completed in conjunction with a partnership between Gale Cengage Learning and the library, most of the 19th- and 20th-century pamphlets in the collection have been digitized. Some 17,000 Portuguese and Brazilian books and pamphlets are available in the digital collection. According to restrictions imposed by the wills of the de Oliveira Limas, none of the materials may leave the premises. The Oliveira Lima Library is located in the underground level of Mullen Library at 620 Michigan Avenue N.E., Washington, DC 20064.
