= Convention on the Nationality of Women =

1933 international treaty

Convention on the Nationality of Women was the first international treaty ever adopted concerning women's rights. It was adopted in 1933 by the Pan American Union in Montevideo, Uruguay. It was ratified by delegates from Argentina, Bolivia, Brazil, Chile, Colombia, Cuba, Dominican Republic, Ecuador, El Salvador, Guatemala, Haiti, Honduras, Mexico, Nicaragua, Panama, Paraguay, Peru, United States of America, Uruguay, and Venezuela. Reservations subject to legislative reform of domestic laws were made by the delegates from El Salvador, Honduras, and the United States.

At the Hague Codification Conference in 1930, the issue of discriminatory nationality laws was raised. In many countries, women lost their nationality upon marriage and had no control over their own assets or children. After a multi-year study completed by the Inter-American Commission of Women, Doris Stevens presented their findings showing the disparity of laws governing citizenship between men and women to the delegates. The Seventh International Conference of American States agreed that "There shall be no distinction based on sex as regards nationality, in their legislation or in their practice".

This agreement, which effected only the status of the member states in the Americas, was the precursor to the United Nations own study on the subject of nationality begun in 1948. The Convention on the Nationality of Married Women passed in 1957, extending nationality protection to women beyond the Americas.

== Sources ==
- Freeman, Marsha A.; Rudolf, Beate; Chinkin, Christine (2012). The UN Convention on the Elimination of All Forms of Discrimination Against Women: A Commentary. Oxford, England: OUP Oxford. ISBN 978-0-19-956506-1.
- Green, James Frederick (1956). The United Nations and Human Rights. Washington, D.C.: Brookings Institution. GGKEY:2G2TCGU8RRR.
