= Markelda Montenegro de Herrera =

Panamanian social scientist (born 1957)

Markelda Montenegro de Herrera (born 1957) is a Panamanian social scientist working on human rights and gender inequality, and has served as Minister for Women.

== Early life and education ==
She was born on 30 January 1957 in San Lorenzo, Chiriquí Province, Panama. She has a degree in law and political science (1987) and a master's degree in education (2013), both from the University of Panama.

== Career ==
Montenegro's research has focused on human rights and gender inequality, including projects such as "Keys to success for quality education, gender inequality in access to elected office" and "Factors involved in femicide in Panama, in indigenous women Ngäbe- Bugle and Afro-descendants ". She has taught at the University of Panama on topics involving law, gender and human rights, and has worked in other areas such as the country's community library program, the promotion of citizen participation, and gender training. She was a member of the commission, which redrafted Panama's criminal code to recognise femicide.

Montenegro was the first director general of the Panamanian Instituto Nacional de la Mujer (National Institute for Women), elected in 2009.

She is the CEO of Centro de Investigaciones Científicas de Ciencias Sociales (CENICS).

She was elected a vice-president of the Inter-American Commission of Women (CIM) for 2013–2015.

In 2014 the Central American Parliament (PARLACEN) declared her to be an "Outstanding Woman" in recognition of her work for the women's rights in the region.

== Selected publications ==
- Noriega, Gabriela; Herrera, Luis Carlos; Montenegro, Markelda; Torres-Lista, Virginia (1 July 2020). "Autoestima, motivación y resiliencia en escuelas panameñas con puntajes diferenciados en la Prueba TERCE". Revista de Investigación Educativa. 38 (2): 533–548. doi:10.6018/rie.410461. hdl:10201/95006.
- Herrera, Luis Carlos; Córdoba, Paul; Torres-Lista, Virginia; Montenegro, Markelda (July 2019). "Marginación socioeconómica de Panamá 1990-2010: estableciendo una línea base". Revista Desarrollo y Sociedad (83): 307–351. doi:10.13043/dys.83.8. S2CID 203073246.
