= Inter-American Commission of Women =

International organization

- Inter-American Commission of Women; Comisión Interamericana de Mujeres; Comissão Interamericana de Mulheres; Commission interaméricaine des femmes
- English-language version of the CIM logo (since 2020)

- OAS member states where the CIM operates
- Abbreviation: CIM
- Formation: 1928
- Founded at: Havana, Cuba
- Purpose: "Shape the public policy agenda from a rights-based perspective for the full citizenship of women and the elimination of gender-based discrimination and violence"
- Location: Washington, D.C.
- Region served: OAS member states
- Fields: Women's rights
- Official language: Spanish, English, Portuguese, French
- Executive Secretary: Alejandra Mora Mora
- Board of directors: Executive Committee
- Main organ: Assembly of Delegates
- Parent organization: Organization of American States (OAS)
- Website: www.oas.org/en/cim/

The Inter-American Commission of Women (Spanish: Comisión Interamericana de Mujeres, Portuguese: Comissão Interamericana de Mulheres, French: Commission interaméricaine des femmes), abbreviated CIM, (Note: The abbreviation CIM, commonly used in English, derives from its Spanish name, Comisión Interamericana de Mujeres.) is an organization that falls within the Organization of American States. It was established in 1928 by the Sixth Pan-American Conference and is composed of one female representative from each Republic in the Union. In 1938, the CIM was made a permanent organization, with the goal of studying and addressing women's issues in the Americas.

CIM was the first intergovernmental organization designed specifically to address the civil and political needs of women, and in many ways has led the movement for international women's rights. In 1933, CIM became the first international organization to present a resolution for international suffrage for women, which was not ratified, as well as the first to submit a treaty which was adopted concerning women's rights. This treaty, the 1933 Convention on the Nationality of Women, established that marriage did not affect nationality. The women of the CIM submitted a resolution and attained the first international acknowledgement of women's political and civil rights (1938). They also researched and prepared the first-ever treaty on violence against women which was approved as the 1994 Belém do Pará Convention. By attaining international agreements, the delegates of the CIM are able to pressure change in their home countries to comply with those resolutions.

Since 1955, CIM has regularly reported to the United Nations on the status of women in the Americas and works to implement U.N. Conventions in the Western Hemisphere.

== History ==
=== Founding ===
When it became known that one of the three topics to be discussed at the 1930 meeting of the League of Nations would be the subject of nationality and how that could be codified in international law, Doris Stevens, a well-known feminist from the United States determined that the first priority of feminists should be to study how law effected women's nationality. For example, at the time, upon marrying, a British woman would have lost her British citizenship had she married an Argentine, but as Argentina's law did not confer citizenship upon her for marriage, she became stateless. Stevens worked with Alice Paul of the National Woman's Party of the United States to review and prepare a report evaluating how women were effected by various laws. The women compiled a monumental report, which indexed all laws controlling women's nationality from every country in their native language and then translated each law on an accompanying page.

Stevens spent three months in Europe meeting with women leaders and compiling information. She met with Dr. Luisa Baralt of Havana, Dr. Ellen Gleditsch of Oslo, Chrystal Macmillan and Sybil Thomas, Viscountess Rhondda of the UK, the Marquesa del Ter of Spain, Maria Vérone of France and Hélène Vacaresco of Romania, as well as various officers of the International Federation of University Women and others. She held public meetings to discuss the question of nationality in Geneva, London and Paris and attended a meeting at the Assembly of the League of Nations to obtain approval of a resolution for governments to attend a meeting discussing codification of laws and encouraged them to include women in their delegate selections. The resolution was submitted and passed unanimously. In anticipation of a cooperative meeting between women in Europe and the Americas a conference was held at the Pan American Union to present the topic of women's nationality.

As a result, the governing body of the Pan American Union created the Inter-American Commission of Women at their meeting in Havana on 4 April 1928. The provision called for a commission composed of seven women from the countries of the Americas and that those women should review data and prepare information to allow the Seventh Pan American Conference to consider women's civil and political equality in the region. It also called for expansion of the commission to eventually have one delegate for each country in the Pan American Union. Stevens, who had suggested the commission was appointed as chair and the other six countries were selected by lot. The chosen countries were Argentina, Colombia, El Salvador, Haiti, Panama, and Venezuela and the appointed delegates were Dr. Ernestina A. López de Nelson from Argentina, María Elena de Hinestrosa from Colombia, María Alvárez de Guillén Rivas from El Salvador, Alice Téligny Mathon from Haiti, Clara González from Panama and Lucila Luciani de Pérez Díaz from Venezuela.

=== 1930 Havana meeting ===
The headquarters of the CIM were to be located in Washington DC in the offices of the Pan-American Union, but there was no organized staff and only some of the women had the backing of their governments. Most were chosen from the women's organizations in their countries. To foster on-going unity and continuity, the women decided to meet every two years, in addition to meeting for the scheduled Pan-American Conferences. As such, the first meeting was held in Havana in 1930. The members were, Flora de Oliveira Lima (Brazil), Aída Parada (Chile), Lydia Fernández (Costa Rica), Elena Mederos de González (Cuba), Gloria Moya de Jiménez (Dominican Republic), Irene de Peyré (Guatemala), Margarita Robles de Mendoza (Mexico), Juanita Molina de Fromen (Nicaragua), Clara González (Panama), Teresa Obregoso de Prevost (Peru), and Doris Stevens (USA). As their governments provided no funding for their attendance, only the women from Cuba, the Dominican Republic, Nicaragua, Panama, the United States and delegates from Alicia Ricode de Herrera (Colombia), MMe Fernand Dennis (Haiti), El Salvador by proxy and Cecilia Herrera de Olavarría (Venezuela) were able to attend, A group of psychiatrists, who had asked if they could attend and observe the meeting, intimidated the women and little was accomplished.

=== 1933 extension ===
At the Seventh Pan-American Conference, held in Montevideo, Uruguay the women presented their analysis of the legal status of women in each of the twenty-one countries in the Pan-American Union. It was the first report ever to study in detail the civil and political rights of women and it had been prepared solely by women. The conference considered and rejected the proposed Treaty on the Equality of Rights for Women, though it was signed by Cuba, Ecuador, Paraguay, and Uruguay. Three of those states had already granted suffrage to women, and none of the four ratified the Treaty after the conference. However, the women had presented the first international resolution to recommend suffrage for women.

The women presented their materials which showed the disparity between rights of men and women. For example, in 16 countries of the Americas women could not vote at all, in two countries they could vote with restrictions and in three countries they had equal enfranchisement. In 19 of the American countries, women did not have equal custody over their children, including in 7 US states and only 2 countries allowed joint authority for women of their own children. None of the Latin American countries allowed women to serve on juries and 27 US states prohibited women from participating in juries. Divorce grounds in 14 countries and 28 states were disparate for men and women and a woman could not administer her own separate property in thirteen countries and two US states.

Conference reviewed the data and approved the first international agreement ever adopted concerning the women's rights—the Convention on the Nationality of Women. The instrument made it clear that should a woman marry a man of a different nationality, her citizenship could be retained. The specific language was, "There shall be no distinction based on sex as regards nationality". In addition, the conference passed the Convention on Nationality which established that neither marriage nor divorce could affect the nationality of the members of a family, extending citizenship protection to children as well. The Roosevelt administration argued that the women's job had been completed. Rather than voting for a continuation of the CIM, the Conference voted as a unit, with the exception of Argentina, to block the US proposal to shut down the women.

=== 1938 permanent status ===
At the 1938 Conference of the Pan-American States, held in Lima, Peru, the US delegation introduced two resolutions. The first, which was actually aimed at wresting control of CIM from Doris Stevens, proposed reorganizing the Inter-American Commission of Women, making it permanent and giving each government the means to appoint their own "official" representative. Disregarding the other delegates' lack of support, the Roosevelt administration maintained that Stevens was not an official US representative as she had been appointed by the Pan-American Union and appointed Mary Nelson Winslow of the US Department of Labor's Women's Bureau as their delegate. Ultimately, the US initiative was adopted and the CIM was fully reorganized between 1938 and 1940 as a subsidiary commission of the Pan-American Union. It lost its autonomy becoming an official governmental entity bound by state aims, but gained official financing and support.

The other was a resolution endorsing protective legislation for women. Feminismo Peruano ZAC, the primary suffrage organization in Peru, publicly took a position similar to the US and split from the official position of Stevens and CIM to back the Equal Rights Treaty. The Peruvian women, couched their plea for suffrage in terms of protection of traditional values of the church, the family, charity and honor. Giving women the vote so that they could help protect these fundamental goals of the nation, the Lima Declaration in favor of Women's Rights proposed that women rights included "political treatment on the basis of equality with men, [and] to the enjoyment of equality as to civil status...to full protection in and opportunity for work, [and] to the most ample protection as mothers". The resolution was approved and was the first international acknowledgement of women's political and civil rights leading the way for other international organizations to follow suit.

=== War years and 1940s ===
In November 1939, the CIM headquarters were moved to Buenos Aires and the chairmanship of the organization passed from Winslow to Ana Rosa de Martínez Guerrero of Argentina. During the 1940s United States' backing of women's political rights supported the emancipation goals of the CIM, which increasingly called for its delegates to adopt proactive roles for suffrage. Voting rights were passed in El Salvador in 1939 and the Dominican Republic in 1942. The CIM delegates drafted multiple resolutions calling on the governments of the Americas to grant women suffrage and the 1943 meeting required delegates to work for both civil and political rights for women in their home countries instead of just observing and reporting on women's statuses. As further incentive, bulletins began to specifically mention delegates' activities, and what progress was being made. The 1944 assembly included women delegates from 19 of the 21 member countries of the Pan-American Union and 1945 saw Guatemala and Panama granting enfranchisement, followed by Argentina and Venezuela in 1947. In October 1945, the CIM delegation successfully moved that the phrase "the equal rights of men and women" be inserted into the United Nations Charter, citing the precedent of the 1938 Lima Declaration.

The 9th Pan-American Conference, held in Bogotá, Colombia, in 1948 culminated in the passage of two resolutions: the Inter-American Convention on Granting of Political Rights to Women and the Inter-American Convention on the Granting of Civil Rights to Women. With the Conference approval for the creation of the Organization of American States, the CIM was brought under its umbrella and became an international forum for bringing women's issues into public discourse.

=== Mid-century to close of the 20th century ===
The push for suffrage of all member states continued to be a focus for the women through the early 1960s, with Paraguay being the last of the original member states to grant emancipation in 1961. The decades from the 1960s to the 1990s also saw the additions of the Nations of the Caribbean gaining their independence, joining the OAS and sending women delegates to the CIM. With the addition of Belize and Guyana in 1990, the organization's membership was representative of all independent nations in the Americas except Cuba.

Canada joined as an observer member in 1972, and the focused changed from voting rights to protections against violence, and for health and employment programs. By the 1970s gender perspectives had emerged with a recognition of gender-bias in terms of cultural, social and historical construction based on the biological basis of sex. There was recognition that biological sex itself does not create disparity, but rather the perceived differences of gender roles as defined by cultures and social tradition. In order for equality to occur, CIM recognized that cultural, economic, political and social systems needed to be evaluated and redesigned so that women and men equally benefit. They introduced the Regional Action Plan, targeted to include working class and indigenous women as well as the traditional educated, middle-class women of previous decades. The CIM completed around 200 projects, between 1975 and 1985, ranging from entrepreneurship training to animal husbandry, from leadership training to skills development, from development of craft cooperatives to developing of labor unions and from providing legal aids to creating political awareness and participation.

In the late 1980s use of rape as a tool in war by official regimes in El Salvador, Haiti, Peru, and other places across Latin America was exposed, while the traditional taboo on domestic violence was gradually eroded at the same time, forcing violence against women into the forefront of public discourse. As most military dictatorships fell across Latin America during the Third Wave of Democratization (1978–1995), women began to pressure their civilian governments to address the systemic violence against women from Brazil to Chile to Mexico. In 1988, CIM strategy followed its model of creating international norms to press for national governmental change. To that end, the women determined to draft an Inter-American Convention focusing on violence against women and scheduled a special consultative meeting in 1990. The 1990 Inter-American Consultation on Women and Violence was the first diplomatic meeting of its kind. At the convention, the women thoroughly evaluated the issue of gender based violence and then organized two inter-governmental meetings of experts to assist with clarification of issues to draft a proposal. The final instrument, which would become known as the 1994 Convention of Belém do Pará, was the first treaty to ever address violence against women. It was presented at a Special Special Assembly of CIM delegates in April 1994, who approved it and endorsed its submission to the General Assembly of the OAS. It was adopted at Belém do Pará, Brazil, in June 1994, and has been endorsed by 32 of the 34 member States of the OAS.

The delegates of the CIM continued to press for international agreements throughout the Americas that effect change and protect women. In 1998, they adopted the Declaration of Santo Domingo, which recognized that women's inalienable rights exist throughout their lifetime and are an "integral, and indivisible part of universal human rights".

=== 21st century beginnings ===
In 2000 the first Hemispheric Ministerial Meeting on the Advancement of Women was held and a new plan adopted for the new century. Thirty-three of the member states sent delegates and in addition, the meeting was attended by Madeleine Albright US Secretary of State; Gladys Caballero de Arévalo, Vice President of Honduras; María Eugenia Brizuela de Ávila, Foreign Minister of El Salvador; Indranie Chandarpal, Guyana's Minister of Human Services and Social Security and CIM Vice president; Graciela Fernández Meijide, Argentinian Minister of Social Development and the Environment; and Marisabel Rodríguez de Chávez, First Lady of Venezuela. The women adopted the "Inter-American Program on the Promotion of Women's Humans Rights and Gender Equity and Equality" with the goal of legal equality between men and women.

== Current organization ==
The current organizational structure calls for the Assembly of Delegates to meet every two years to examine hemispheric issues and evaluate reports of progress or concern. Meetings are held in even years and the elections which occur are effective for two-year periods of the following odd years. For example, at the last meeting held in 2014 officers were elected to begin serving in 2015–2017.

The CIM Executive Committee has eight delegates elected at the bi-annual Assembly of Delegates meetings. They meet at more regular intervals to address areas of immediate concern. The Executive Committee membership has developed as follows:

CIM Executive Committee
Years of service	Title	Name	Countries	Notes/ Details
2013–2015	President	Maureen Clarke	Costa Rica	
2013–2015	Vice President	Marie Yanick Mezile	Haiti	
2013–2015	Vice President	Markelda Montenegro de Herrera	Panama	
2013–2015	Vice President	Beatriz Ramírez Abella	Uruguay	
2013–2015	Members at Large		Barbados, Guatemala, Mexico, Peru and the United States	
2011–2013	President	Rocío García Gaytán	Mexico	
2011–2013	Vice President	Magdalena Faillace	Argentina	
2011–2013	Vice President	Irene Sandiford-Garner	Barbados	
2011–2013	Vice President	Sonia Escobedo	Guatemala	
2011–2013	Members at Large		Brazil, Costa Rica, Panama, Paraguay and (Trinidad and Tobago) Trinidad & Tobago	
2009–2011	President	Laura Albornoz Pollman*	Chile	*resigned in October 2009 and remainder of term was filled by Wanda K. Jones the United States
2009–2011	Vice President	Jeanette Carrillo Madrigal*	Costa Rica	*resignation in November 2009 and remainder of term was filled by Loretta Butler-Turner (The Bahamas) Bahamas
2009–2011	Members at Large		Antigua and Barbuda, (The Bahamas) Bahamas, Colombia, Mexico and the United States	
2007–2009	President	Jacqui Quinn-Leandro	Antigua and Barbuda	
2007–2009	Vice President	Martha Lucía Vazquéz Zawadsky	Colombia	
2007–2009	Members at Large		Brazil, Guatemala, Haiti, Peru and Uruguay	
2005–2007	President	Nilcéa Freire	Brazil	
2005–2007	Vice President	María José Argaña de Mateu	Paraguay	
2005–2007	Members at Large		Argentina, Canada, Chile, Mexico and Suriname	
2003–2005	President	Yadira Henríquez	Dominican Republic	
2003–2005	Vice President	Florence Ievers	Canada	
2003–2005	Members at Large		Guatemala, Nicaragua, Paraguay, the United States and Venezuela	
2001–2003	President	Indranie Chandarpal	Guyana	
2001–2003	Vice President	Nora Uribe	Venezuela	
2001–2003	Members at Large		Canada, El Salvador, Honduras, Dominican Republic and Uruguay	
1999–2001	President	Dulce Maria Sauri Riancho	Mexico	
1999–2001	Vice President	Indranie Chandarpal	Guyana	
1999–2001	Members at Large		Argentina, Colombia, Jamaica, Paraguay and the United States	

Every four years, CIM organizes the Meeting of Ministers or Meeting of the "Highest-Ranking Authorities responsible for the Advancement of Women in the Member States" (REMIM). This meeting brings together those highest ranking women from each of the OAS member states for a discussion of policy, key issues, and recommendations of topics for ministerial level meetings, such as the Summit of the Americas.

At its discretion, the CIM can call discretionary meetings or extraordinary meetings to discuss policy, hold seminars of awareness or other educational or organizational meetings to advance the causes of women.

== Previous officers/delegates ==
- 1930–40 Margarita Robles de Mendoza, Mexico
- 1930–36/1945–49 Marta Vergara, Chile
- 1938–48 María Currea Manrique, Colombia
- 1941–54 Ángela Acuña Braun, Costa Rica
- 1947–51 Chair Minerva Bernardino, Dominican Republic
- 1947–51 Vice Chair Amalia González Caballero de Castillo Ledón, Mexico
- 1957–61 President Graciela Quan, Guatemala
- 1957–61 Vice chair Frances Marron Lee, the United States
