= Beatriz Ramírez Abella =

Uruguayan politics and activist

Beatriz Ramírez Abella (born 1956) is a Uruguayan feminist and activist working for Afro-Uruguayan rights. She is an anthropologist and educator teaching about class, ethnicity and gender and the biases surrounding these issues. She is the current director of the Uruguayan Instituto Nacional de las Mujeres (INMUJERES) (National Institute of Woman) and served as vice-chair on the Inter-American Commission of Women from 2013-2015.

== Biography ==
Angelica Beatriz Ramírez Abella was born on 18 September 1956 in Montevideo, Uruguay. She completed both grammar and secondary school in the public school system. Beginning in 1972, she started joining black youth groups and in 1973, founded the Grupos de Jóvenes de Asociación Cultural y Social Negro (ACSUN) (Black Cultural and Social Association Youth Group). She was also a co-founder of the Organización Mundo Afro (African World Organization).

In 1988, she attended the School of Social Service and the following year enrolled in gender studies at Grupo de Estudios sobre la Condicion de la Mujer en Uruguay (GRECMU) (Study Group on the Status of Women in Uruguay). In 1994 completed further studies on ethnicity and gender at Geledés Instituto da Mulher Negra (Geledés Institute of Black Women) in Brazil. She is a member of the Faculty of Humanities and teaches anthropology at the University of Uruguay. She has taught courses on ethnicity and gender at the Instituto Centro Latinoamericano de Economía Humana (CLAEH) (Central Latin American Institute for Human Economy); at the Black Association for the Defense and Promotion of Human Rights in Peru in 1993; and at the Global Afro-Latin and Caribbean Initiative in New York and Washington, DC. Since 2000 she has been part of the teaching network of the Instituto Superior de Formacion Afro (Afro-Training Institute of Higher Education).

Throughout her career, Ramírez Abella has worked to improve access for people of African descent living in Latin America. She co-founded Proyecto Social Capitanes de la Arena, (CIPFE) (Social Captains of the Sand) in 1988 and served as its coordinator to assist street children and homeless persons. In 1992, she co-founded of the Network of Afro-Latin and Afro-Caribbean Women to better address issues which effect double minorities. She has also participated in conferences, such as the Third World Conference against Racism, and Xenophobia Related Intolerance held in Santiago, Chile in 2000; regional meetings of black parliamentarians held in Brasilia and Costa Rica; and as a member of the Delegation of Peace Mission to Colombia in 2002, among many others. She researches bias and has published numerous articles in newspapers and magazines such as Fem Press and Revista de Cotidiano Mujer.

In 2005, she joined the Ministry of Social Development's National Women's Institute and in 2009 became head of the Instituto Nacional de las Mujeres (INMUJERES) (National Institute of Woman). As the director, she oversees governmental programs dealing with class, ethnicity and gender. In 2012, she was elected to serve as a Vice-chair on the Inter-American Commission of Women for the 213-2015 term.
