= María Elena González Mederos =

Cuban-American government statistician, poetry translator, and human rights activist

María Elena González Mederos (1932 – February 19, 1996) was a Cuban-American government statistician, poetry translator, and human rights activist.

== Early life and education ==
González was born in Cuba, the daughter of Cuban human rights activist Elena Mederos. She became a student at the University of Havana before and completing a degree at the University of Chicago in 1953. She left Cuba with her mother in 1961, earned a master's degree at the London School of Economics in 1963, and earned a second master's degree at Columbia University in 1968 with the thesis An optimal sample design for a job vacancy survey.

== Career and statistical recognition ==
González joined the US government service in 1970 as a statistician for the United States Census Bureau. In 1974, she moved to the Office of Management and Budget, where she worked for the rest of her life, including founding and serving for 20 years as chair of the Federal Committee on Statistical Methodology, and participating in the Inter-American Statistical Conference, Inter-American Statistical Institute, and United Nations Economic Commission for Latin America and the Caribbean.

She was named as a Fellow of the American Statistical Association in 1982, and also became an Elected Member of the International Statistical Institute. She was president of the Washington Statistical Society for the 1983–1984 term. An edited volume of research on methodology in statistical economics, Turning Administrative Systems Into Information Systems (1995), was dedicated in her honor.

== Translation and activism ==
González became the translator into English of the book La Campana Del Alba [The Bell of Dawn], children's poems by Cuban political prisoner Ernesto Díaz Rodríguez, smuggled from his prison and published in 1989. She also worked to pressure Cuba to release its political prisoners, and served as treasurer for Cuban human rights organization Of Human Rights.
