= Yadira Henríquez =

Dominican attorney and politician

Yadira Henríquez (born 1958) (also known as Yadira Henríquez de Sánchez Baret) is a Dominican attorney and politician who has worked in criminal law, international law, land law and women's rights throughout her career. Between 1994 and 2000 she served in the Chamber of Deputies as a representative for the Partido Revolucionario Dominicano (PRD) (Dominican Revolutionary Party) of the Dominican Republic. In 2000 she was appointed as Minister, serving as the Secretary of State for Women of Dominican Republic and in 2002, was elected as the president of the Inter-American Commission of Women, serving that body from 2003-2005.

== Biography ==
Yadira Henríquez Núñez was born on 24 January 1958 in La Vega, Dominican Republic to Ramona Núñez and Eladio Henríquez, who was a founder of the PRD. She graduated with a degree in law from the Universidad Autónoma de Santo Domingo (UASD) (Autonomous University of Santo Domingo), specializing in criminal law, land law and international law. In 1977, she began organizing and running campaigns for the PRD and first came to prominence as a councilwoman on the City Council of the Federal District.

Henríquez became a member of the Chamber of Deputies in 1994. During her tenure in the Chamber, she, along with others, promoted laws to address domestic violence and an electoral reform law requiring that a minimum of 25% of political posts for municipal positions must be held by women. She served until 1998 and was re-elected for a second term from 1998 to 2000. In 2000, she became head of a new Ministry and served as the Secretary of State for Women of Dominican Republic. In 2002, Henríquez was elected as the president of the Inter-American Commission of Women, serving that body from 2003-2005. During the same time-frame, she served as general secretary of the Federacion Dominicana de Mujeres Social Democratas (FEDOMUSDE), assuming the presidency of that organization from 2005 to 2009.

She is married to the attorney Vicente Sánchez Baret, who previously served as a Senator for the Sánchez Ramírez Province, Dominican Republic.
