= Irene Sandiford-Garner =

Barbadian politician

- Born: 4 August 1961 (age 64); United Kingdom
- Education: St. Andrew's Girls' Primary School, Queen's College, Barbados Community College, University of the West Indies (Cave Hill), Virginia Commonwealth University
- Occupations: Politician, journalist, businesswoman, activist
- Office: Senator and Parliamentary Secretary, Ministry of Culture and Community Development
- Political party: Democratic Labour Party
- Spouse: Granville Garner
- Children: 2 (Fidel and Malcolm)

Irene Sandiford-Garner (born 4 August 1961) is a Barbadian politician, journalist, businesswoman and activist, who is a member of the Democratic Labour Party and national delegate to the Inter-American Commission of Women.

== Early life and education ==
Sandiford-Garner was born in the United Kingdom and moved to Barbados at the age of eight. She grew up in Saint Andrew Parish, and received her education at St. Andrew's Girls' Primary School, Queen's College, Barbados Community College and the University of the West Indies at Cave Hill Campus. She also received a scholarship by an earlier employer, the Nation Publishing Company, to study in the US at Virginia Commonwealth University in Richmond.

== Career ==
Sandiford-Garner has been cited as the first female Barbadian journalist to land on Grenada after US intervention in 1983. Between 1995 and 2006 Sandiford-Garner served as a marketing manager for Barbados's largest credit union, in which she was responsible for launching them in the US, a year after she became employed with them.

After a career in journalism and marketing, Sandiford-Garner joined the Democratic Labour Party . Since February 2008 she has been a senator and Parliamentary Secretary in the Ministry of Culture and Community Development, and since August 2008, she has been a national delegate to the Inter-American Commission of Women. She has also been involved in the 25th Regional Women of the Church of God Symposium, various UNIFEM workshops across the Caribbean, and was a featured speaker for the 2009 International Women's Day symposium, held by the National Organization for Women (NOW).

== Personal life ==
Sandiford-Garner is married to Granville Garner and has two sons, Fidel and Malcolm. The couple own a laundry and an entertainment management firm.
