= Alejandra Mora Mora =

Costa Rican jurist, lawyer, professor and politician

Minister of Women's Affairs of Costa Rica
- In office 2014–2018
- President: Luis Guillermo Solís

Executive President of the National Institute for Woman
- In office 2012–2018

Personal details
- Born: 1970 (age 55–56)
- Party: Citizens' Action Party
- Education: University of Costa Rica
- Occupation: Lawyer, professor, politician

Alejandra Mora Mora (born 1970) is a Costa Rican jurist, lawyer, professor, and politician. Currently, she serves as the Executive Secretary of the Inter-American Commission of Women. She has been a human rights activist, especially in the area of women's rights. She served as her country's Minister of Women's Affairs from 2014 to 2018, was president of the National Institute for Woman (INAMU), and director of the women's section of the Ombudsman's Office of Costa Rica.

== Education ==
Alejandra Mora Mora earned a law degree from the University of Costa Rica in 1989. She completed specialization courses at Lund University and the Raoul Wallenberg Institute in 1997, a master's degree in constitutional law from the Distance State University of Costa Rica in 2004, and a postgraduate degree in human rights from the University of Chile in 2007.

== Career ==
Mora began her professional career in 1989 at the Ministry of Justice of Costa Rica headed by Odio Benítez. From 1989 to 1993, she was national chief of the legal department, national chief of advocacy, member of the National Institute of Criminology, and advisor to the women's section of the General Human Rights Ombudsman.

Between 1993 and 2002, she was the director of the women's section of the Ombudsman's Office. From 2002 to 2006, she was the director of the advisory team of the Citizens' Action Party in the Legislative Assembly. From 2007 to 2014, she returned to her previous position as director of the women's section of the Ombudsman's Office. In 2013, she conducted an investigation on the rights of women for the state of the nation.

From 2012 to 2018, Mora was executive president of the INAMU, and from 2014 to 2018 she was Minister of Women's Affairs in the Solís Rivera administration and a member of the Governing Council. At this stage, she focused on the design and governance of public policies regarding discrimination and violence against women. In 2018, she returned to her position as director of the women's section of the Ombudsman's Office.

In the field of international representation, she was coordinator of the International Federation for Human Rights in 2000, and coordinator of the Ibero-American Ombudsman Federation's Network for Women in 2012. From 2012 to 2016, she was president of the Inter-American Commission of Women (CIM) and of the Follow-up Mechanism to the Convention of Belém do Pará (MESECVI) of the Organization of American States (OAS), as well as women's advisor to the UN's High-level Panel for Empowerment. In July 2019, she returned to the CIM as its executive secretary.

Mora is a professor of family law at the University of Costa Rica. She has taught at various universities since 1998, such as the University of La Salle, the University of Costa Rica, and the Distance State University. Since 2000, she has been invited to national and international forums as an expert on women's rights, for the elaboration, advocacy, and lobbying for the approval of laws against harassment and violence, and promoting responsible parenthood.

== Awards and recognitions ==
- In 2018 she was designated by the Apolitical Group as one of the 100 most influential people in the world in gender policies in its "Gender Equality Top 100".
- In 2019 she received the Women's Institution Award from the Chamber of Commerce in the framework of the Program for the Development of Women Entrepreneurs.

== Works ==
- 2009: Co-author of Haciendo visible lo invisible, compilation of cases of the defense of women's rights
- 2010: Article "El derecho de familia y los derechos Humanos" in Derecho de Familia en Latinoamérica, Editorial Nuevo Enfoque Jurídico, Córdoba, Argentina
- 2011: Ley contra el Hostigamiento Sexual en el Empleo y la Docencia, commented and annotated, Editorial Juritexto, 1st edition, San José, Costa Rica
- 2012: Article: "La progresividad y el Derecho de familia" in El derecho de Familia en Latinoamérica, Editorial Nuevo Enfoque Jurídico, Argentina

=== Periodicals ===
- 1991, 1992, 1995: Co-author of brochures Jurisprudencia Constitucional sobre el Derecho Penitenciario, Hostigamiento Sexual: Algunas Reflexiones Teóricas-Jurídicas, Violencia en las relaciones de Pareja
- 1996: "¿Quién ejerce la Patria Potestad de los hijos extramatrimoniales en Costa Rica?" in IVSTITIA No. 114-115, June–July
- 2000: "Ley contra el Hostigamiento sexual: Comentarios a la ley y un análisis desde el principio de igualdad jurídica", IVSTITIA No. 159, March
- 2000: "Compilación de Jurisprudencia de la Defensoría de la Mujer", booklets of the Ombudsman's Office
- 2002: "El mundo jurídico como instrumento para el adelanto de las condiciones y situaciones de las mujeres: Una aproximación a la Ley de Paternidad Responsable", Parlamentaria No. 3, Volume 10, December 2002, Legislative Assembly
