= Convention on the Nationality of Married Women =

1957 United Nations treaty

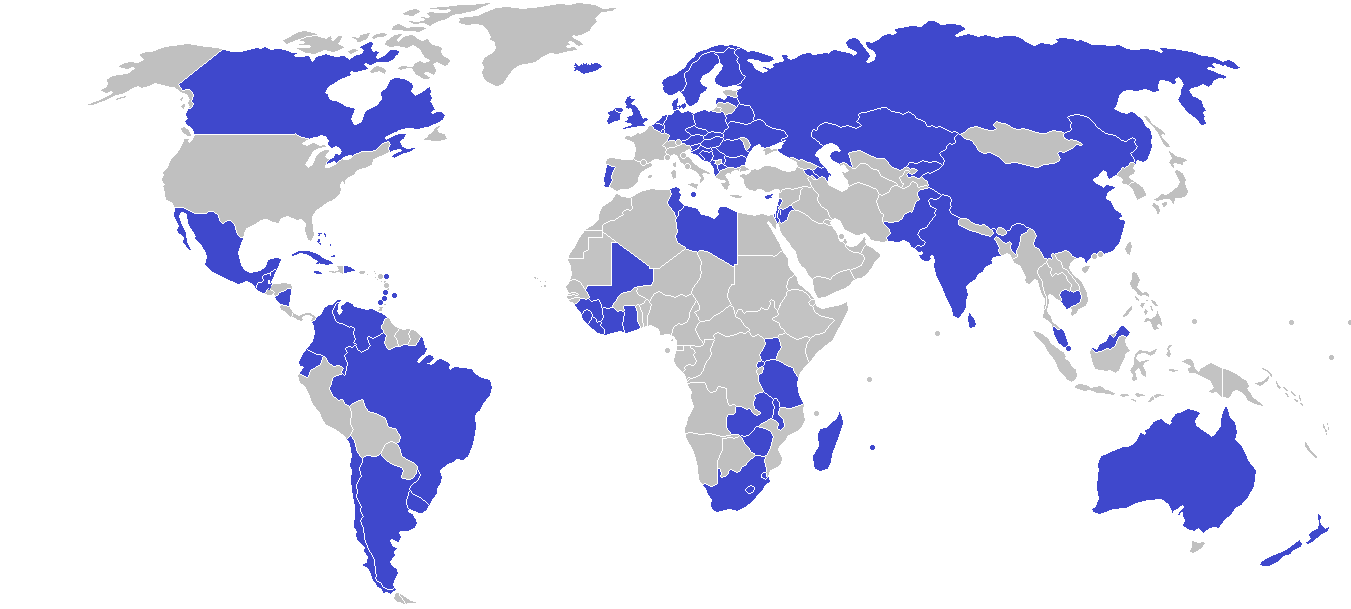
Сountries that have signed the Convention on the Nationality of married women

The Convention on the Nationality of Married Women is an international convention passed by the United Nations General Assembly in 1957. It entered into force in 1958 and as of 2024 it has 75 state parties.

== Background ==
Before the Convention on the Nationality of Married Women, no legislation existed to protect married women's right to retain or renounce national citizenship in the way that men could. Women's rights groups recognized a need to legally protect the citizenship rights of women who married someone from outside their country or nationality. The League of Nations, the international organization later succeeded by the United Nations, was lobbied by women's rights groups during the early 20th century to address the lack of international laws recognizing married women's rights of national citizenship. The Conference for the Codification of International Law, held at The Hague in 1930, drew protests from international women's rights groups, yet the League declined to include legislation enforcing married women's nationality rights. The League took the position that it was not their role, but the role of member states, to deal with equality between men and women.

The International Women's Suffrage Alliance (IWSA, later renamed the International Alliance of Women) launched a telegram campaign in 1931 to pressure the League of Nations to address the lack of legislation. Women from around the world sent telegrams to the League of Nations as a protest. The League made the concession of creating an unfunded Consultative Committee on Nationality of Women.

The Pan-American Conference in Montevideo passed a Convention on the Nationality of Women in 1933. It was passed by the Pan American Conference at the same time as the Treaty on the Equality of Rights Between Men and Women. These were the first pieces of international law to "explicitly set sexual equality as a principle to be incorporated into national legislation" which was required of countries ratifying the convention and treaty. Lobbying by the American National Women's Party has been credited with this legislation. However, neither the International Labour Organization (ILO) nor the League of Nations passed any legislation on the issue during the interwar years.

== Entry into force ==
The issue of the nationality of married women was a leading women's rights issue facing the United Nations after its establishment. The United Nations Commission on the Status of Women was created, and made it a priority of their agenda, launching a study in 1948. The Commission recommended to the United Nations Economic and Social Council that legislation be drafted to give women equal rights as set out in Article 15 of the Universal Declaration of Human Rights. The Convention on the Nationality of Married Women entered into force on 11 August 1958.

As of 2013, the convention has been ratified by 74 states. It has been denounced by the ratifying states of Luxembourg, Netherlands, and United Kingdom.

== Purpose ==
The Convention was concluded in the light of the conflicts of law on nationality derived from provisions concerning the loss or acquisition of nationality by women as a result of marriage, divorce, or of the change of nationality by the husband during marriage. It allows women to adopt the nationality of their husband based upon the woman's own decision, but does not require it.

The Convention seeks to fulfill aspirations articulated in Article 15 of the Universal Declaration of Human Rights that "everyone has a right to a nationality" and "no one shall be arbitrarily deprived of his nationality nor denied the right to change his nationality".

== Key principles ==
Article 1

- Woman's nationality not to be automatically affected by marriage to an alien.

Article 2

- Acquisition or renunciation of a nationality by a husband not to prevent the wife's retention of her nationality.

Article 3

- Specially privileged nationality procedures to be available for wives to take the nationality of their husbands.

== See also ==
- Citizenship
- Statelessness
- Statelessness Reduction Convention
