= Eunice Dana Brannan =

American suffragist, feminist and women's rights activist

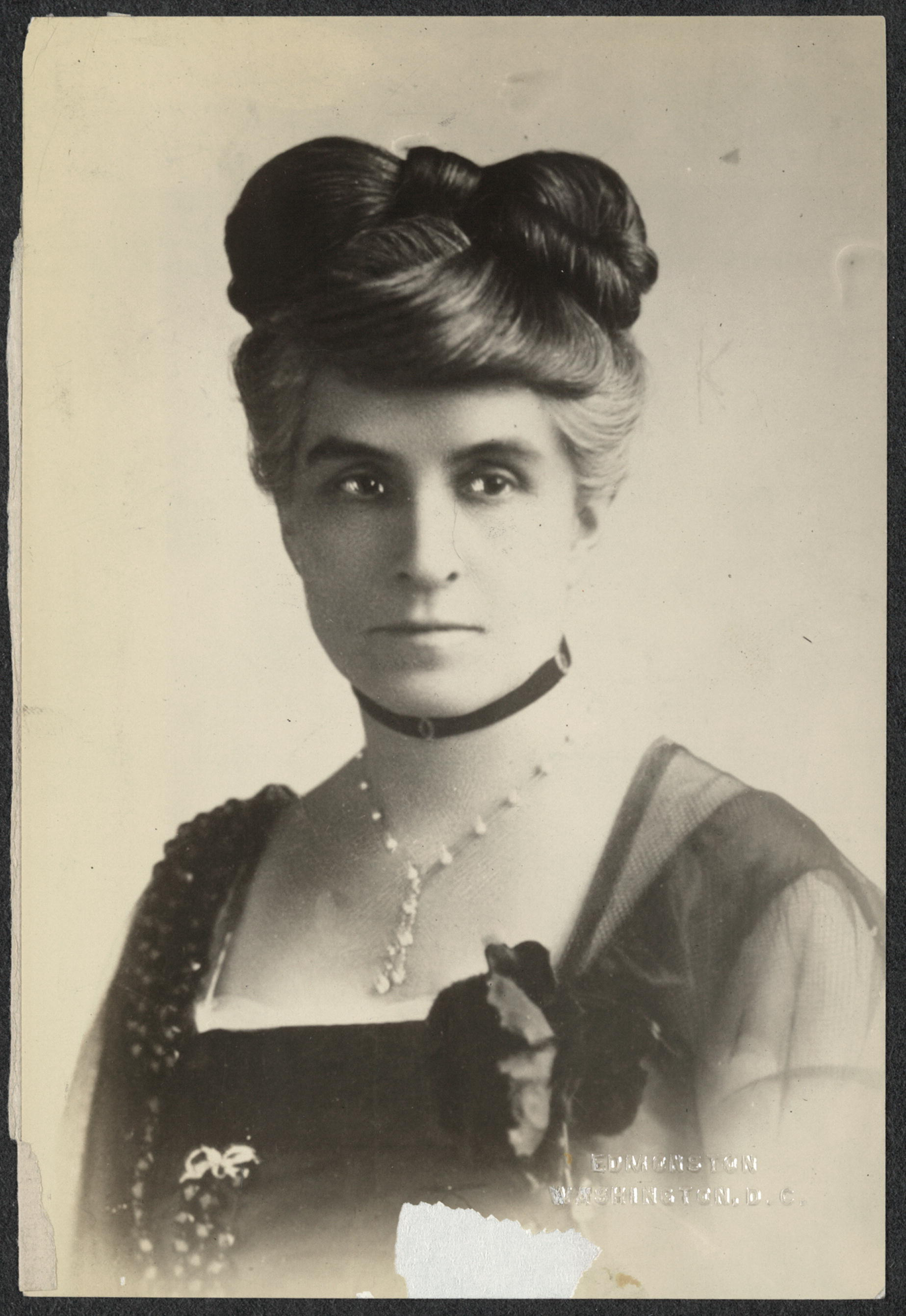
- Eunice Dana Brannan in 1915
- Born: Eunice Mignon Dana; August 27, 1854; Westport, Connecticut
- Died: November 24, 1936
- Occupation: Suffragist
- Political party: National Woman's Party
- Parent(s): Charles A. Dana; Eunice Macdaniel

Eunice Dana Brannan (August 27, 1854 - November 14, 1936) was a feminist activist and a prominent figure in the suffragist movement in New York City. She played an important role in organizing picketings at the White House in protest of president Woodrow Wilson's refusal to support women's suffrage.

== Early life ==
Eunice Dana Brannan was born to Charles A. Dana and Eunice Macdaniel on August 27, 1854 in Westport, Connecticut. She was the youngest of their four children. Charles Dana and Eunice Macdaniel met when they were both living on the Brook Farm Association, an experiment in communal living. After their marriage in 1846 they moved to New York where Charles Dana would become founder of the New York Sun.

In 1882, Brannan married Dr. John Winters Brannan who was a physician and president of the Board of Trustees at Bellvue Hospital. They had three children and their daughter would follow Brannan in joining the women's rights movement.

== Activism ==
In the 1880s, Brannan traveled to England where she gained an appreciation for the public soapbox form of activism used by women's rights activists in the UK.

Brannan was one of the first members of the Women's Political Union, a suffrage group headed by Harriot Stanton Blatch. She served as treasurer to the Union and opened a shop in 1910 to raise money for the suffrage movement. In 1915, she was elected to the executive committee of the Congressional Union for Women's Suffrage, during which time she met with Woodrow Wilson, along with a delegation of women, to discuss a constitutional amendment to allow women to vote. On the committee, she served as chair of finance. During this time, Brannan raised money from wealthy donors. In 1917 she was elected as a board member of the National Women's Party and became chairperson of the New York state branch.

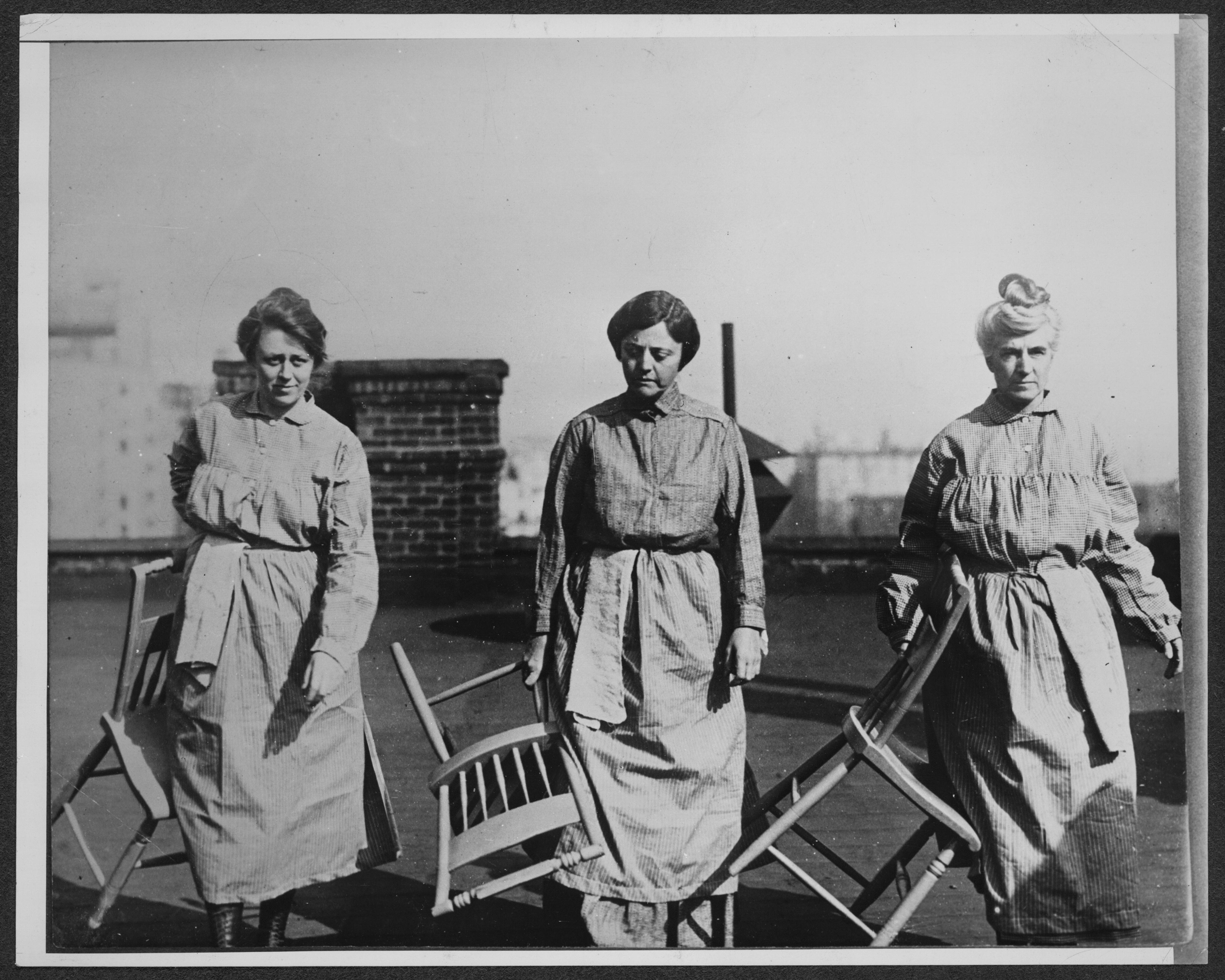
Doris Stevens, Mrs. J.A.H. Hopkins and Eunice Dana Brannan

Brannan was arrested twice for picketing outside the White House in protest of President Woodrow Wilson's opposition to a constitutional amendment allowing women the right to vote. The first time was on November 10, 1917 when she led a group of 41 protesters to the White House to protest the imprisonment of National Women's Party leader, Alice Paul. She and the other women arrested were pardoned by the judge of the case. On November 14, 1917 she was arrested again as part of a group of peaceful protesters picketing in front of the White House, who would become known as the Silent Sentinels. She was sentenced, along with the other women, to 60 days in the Occoquan Workhouse. Upon entering the prison, the women were treated violently by the guards in a night now known as the Night of Terror. Her prisoner number was 5974.

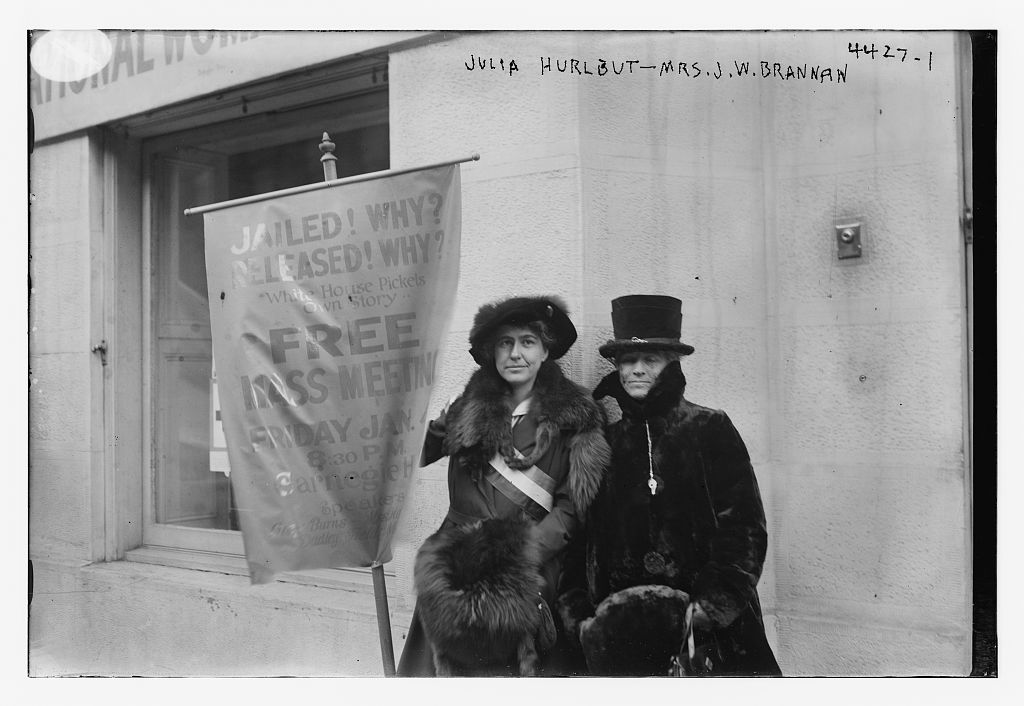
Julia Hurlbut and Eunice Dana Brannan, 1918

Brannan was released on parole after a trial deemed the women not guilty under the law. Her husband, prominent physician Dr. John Winters Brannan, testified at the hearing which influenced the judges decision to pass a not guilty verdict. Brannan was one of only three women who agreed to be released on parole, fearing that further imprisonment under such hard conditions could lead to her death. The rest of the imprisoned suffragettes served their full sentences in the Washington District Jail.

Brannan died in New York on November 14, 1936.
