= Julia Hurlbut =

American suffragist (1882–1962)

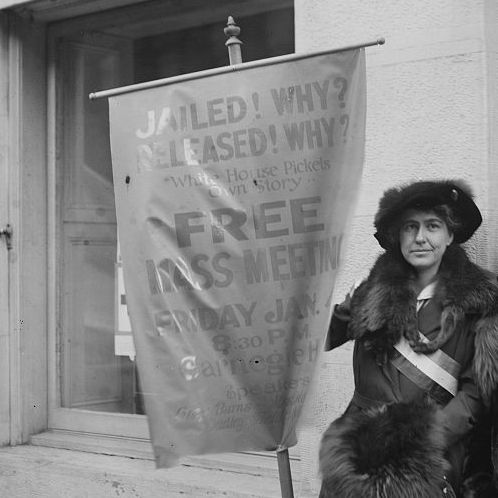
- Julia Hurlbut
- Born: 1882; Morristown, New Jersey
- Died: 1962 (aged 79–80)
- Occupation: Activist

Julia Hurlbut (1882–1962) was an American suffragist known for her participation in the picketing of the White House by the National Woman's Party in 1917.

== Life ==
Born in 1882 in Morristown, New Jersey, Hurlbut served as the vice chairman of the New Jersey branch of the National Woman's Party. In 1916 she assisted in the Washington state campaign. She was arrested picketing July 14, 1917, and sentenced to 60 days in Occoquan Workhouse. She was pardoned by President Wilson after three days. She engaged in war work in France during World War I.

In 1918 Hurlbut traveled to France to support American WWI troops by managing officer's clubs and canteens.

In 1919 Lillian Ascough, Florence Bayard Hilles and Hurlbut were part of the "Prison" Tour where the women spoke publicly, distributed literature, and sold the Suffragist.

Hurlbut died in 1962.
