= American Institute of International Law =

American Institute of International Law was an international scientific association for the study and progress of international law in the United States.

The idea to form an organization that would codify international law was established at a meeting of the Third Committee of American Jurists in Rio de Janeiro on July 16, 1912. The establishment of such an organization was proposed in October 1911.

The institute was founded on October 12, 1912 by James Brown Scott and Alejandro Alvarez, and inaugurated December 29, 1915, at the Second Pan American Scientific Congress, held in Washington, D.C. On January 6, 1916, it adopted a Declaration of the Rights and Duties of Nations. The Declaration differed from other projects of a like kind in that it was not based solely upon philosophic principles, but was based exclusively upon decisions of the Supreme Court of the United States.

The organization met irregularly through at least 1938, churning out several international law papers on topics such as statehood, diplomatic and consular agents, and peaceful international dispute resolution. By 1957, due in part to a lack of financial resources, the Institute was no longer active.

== Objectives ==
The goals of the institute were:

1. To give precision to the general principles of international law as they now exist, or to formulate new ones, in conformity with the solidarity which unites the members of the society of civilized nations, in order to strengthen these bonds and, especially, the bonds between the American peoples;
2. To study questions of international law, particularly questions of an American character, and to endeavor to solve them, either in conformity with generally accepted principles, or by extending and developing them, or by creating new principles adapted to the special needs of the American Continent;
3. To discover a method of codifying the general or special principles of international law, and to elaborate projects of codification on matters which lend themselves thereto;
4. To aid in bringing about the triumph of the principles of justice and of humanity which should govern the relations between peoples, considered as nations, through more extensive instruction in international law, particularly in American universities, through lectures and addresses, as well as through publications and all other means;
5. To organize the study of international law along truly scientific and practical lines in a way that meets the needs of modern life, and taking into account the problems of our hemisphere and American doctrines;
6. To contribute, within the limits of its competence and the means at its disposal, toward the maintenance of peace, or toward the observance of the laws of war and the mitigation of the evils thereof;
7. To increase the sentiment of fraternity among the Republics of the American Continent, so as to strengthen friendship and mutual confidence among the citizens of the countries of the New World.

== Charter members ==
- Argentina: Luis María Drago
- Bolivia: Alberto Gutierrez
- Brazil: Ruy Barbosa
- Chile: Alejandro Álvarez
- Colombia: es:Antonio José Uribe
- Costa Rica: es:Luis Anderson Morúa
- Cuba: Antonio Sánchez de Bustamante y Sirven
- Dominican Republic: Andres Julio Montolio
- Ecuador: es:Rafael María Arízaga
- Guatemala: es:Antonio Batres Jáuregui
- Haiti: Jacques Nicolas Léger
- Honduras: es:Alberto de Jesús Membreño
- Mexico: Joaquín Demetrio Casasús
- Nicaragua: Salvador Castrillo
- Panama: Federico Boyd
- Paraguay: Manuel Gondra
- Peru: es:Ramón Ribeyro
- Salvador: Rafael S. Lopez
- United States of America: James Brown Scott
- Uruguay: Carlos Maria de Pena
- Venezuela: Jose Gil Fortoul

== Bibliography ==
- Harley, John Eugene (1931). International Understanding Agencies Educating for a New World: Agencies Educating for a New World. Stanford University Press. ISBN 978-0-8047-0919-4.
- Lorca, Arnulf Becker (2014). Mestizo International Law. Cambridge University Press. ISBN 978-0-521-76338-7.
- Scott, James Brown (1916). The American Institute of International Law: Its Declaration of the Rights and Duties of Nations. American Institute of International Law. p. 4.
