= Clara Louise Thompson =

American educator, Latinist, feminist, and suffragist

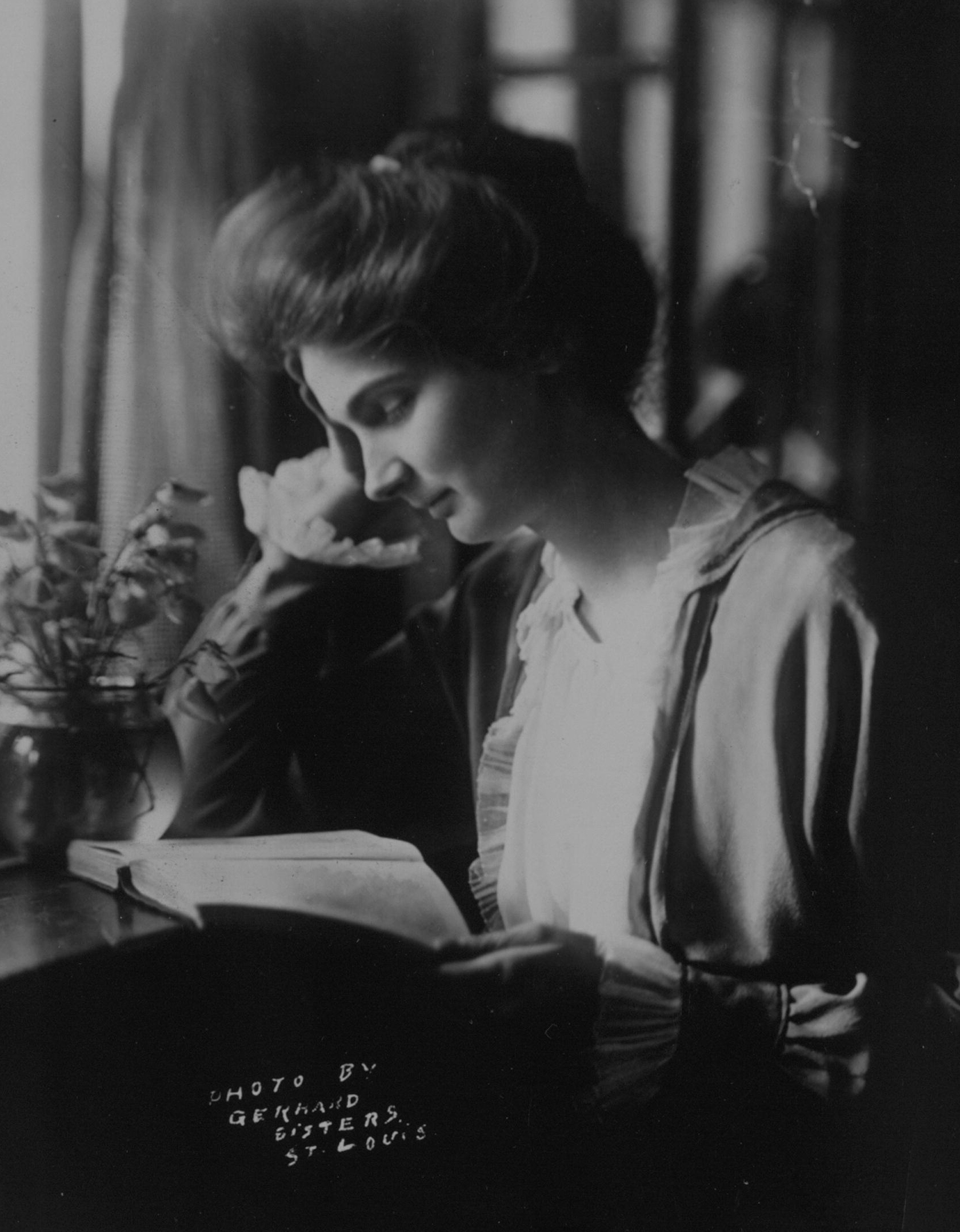
Clara Louise Thompson, c. 1910

Clara Louise Thompson (1884–?) was an American educator, Latinist, activist, feminist, and suffragist. She is the only woman to be awarded the American Fellowship at the American School of Classical Studies in Rome (now, American Academy in Rome).

== Biography ==
Thompson grew up in St. Louis, Missouri, along with a sister, Alice. She studied at Washington University in St. Louis (Bachelor's degree, 1906), University of Pennsylvania (Master's degree, 1908), American School of Classical Studies (Fellowship; now American Academy in Rome), and University of Pennsylvania (Ph.D, 1911). She was active in the suffrage movement. She served as field secretary for the St. Louis Equal Suffrage League in 1913. She served as President of Latin at Rockford College (now Rockford University, and also taught at the University of Pennsylvania. She was the author of Seneca's Octavia as well as articles and other writings in various magazines. Thompson was affiliated with the Advisory Council of the Congressional Union for Woman Suffrage. She was a member of the Classical Association, American Classical League, and American Philosophical Association. She is the only woman to be awarded the American Fellowship at the American School of Classical Studies in Rome (now, American Academy in Rome).

== Personal life ==
Thompson made her home in Rome, Georgia and Saint Louis, Missouri. She had a romantic relationship spanning decades with Jeannette Howard Foster, a librarian, professor, poet, and researcher.

== Bibliography ==
- Adams, Katherine H.; Keene, Michael L. (1 July 2010). After the Vote Was Won: The Later Achievements of Fifteen Suffragists. McFarland. ISBN 978-0-7864-5647-5.
- General Alumni Society (1922). General Alumni Catalogue of the University of Pennsylvania, 1922 (Public domain ed.). University of Pennsylvania. p. 402.
- Passet, Joanne (10 June 2008). Sex Variant Woman: The Life of Jeanette Howard Foster. Da Capo Press. ISBN 978-0-7867-2154-2.
