= Rocío García Gaytán =

Mexican politician (1959–2015)

- Born: 21 October 1959; Guadalajara, Jalisco, Mexico
- Died: 3 April 2015 (aged 55); Mexico City, Mexico
- Occupation: Politician
- Political party: PAN

María del Rocío García Gaytán (21 October 1959 – 3 April 2015) was a Mexican politician from the National Action Party (PAN).

In the 2000 general election, she was elected to the Chamber of Deputies for the 58th Congress as a plurinominal deputy.

She also served as Director of the National Institute of Women (Inmujeres) during Felipe Calderón's government. In 2010, she was elected to chair the steering committee of the Inter-American Commission of Women of the Organization of American States for the 2010–2012 term.

García Gaytán died from cancer on 3 April 2015.
