= Amalia González Caballero de Castillo Ledón =

Mexican diplomat, cabinet minister, minister plenipotentiary and writer

- Born: Amalia González Caballero; 18 August 1898; Santander Jiménez, Jiménez, Tamaulipas, Mexico
- Died: 2 June 1986 (aged 87); Mexico City, Mexico
- Other name: Amalia de Castillo Ledón
- Occupations: Diplomat, cabinet minister, feminist, suffragette, journalist, writer
- Years active: 1929–1980

Amalia González Caballero de Castillo Ledón (18 August 1898 – 2 June 1986) was a Mexican diplomat, cabinet minister, minister plenipotentiary, writer, and the first female member of a presidential cabinet. She distinguished herself for fighting for women rights including her efforts to secure women's voting rights in 1952.

González Caballero studied at the National Autonomous University of Mexico (UNAM). She was the founder and chair of the Club Internacional de Mujeres (1932) and the Ateneo Mexicano de Mujeres (1937). She also founded the Teatro de Masas. She was associated with the journal Hogar and was a columnist for Excélsior. At the founding of the United Nations she served as delegate to the UN Commission on the Status of Women during the drafting of the Universal Declaration of Human Rights. Since 2012, her remains rest in the Rotonda de las Personas Ilustres in Mexico City.

== Biography ==
Amalia González Caballero was born on 18 August 1898 in the San Jerónimo neighborhood of Santander Jiménez, located in the municipality of Jiménez, Tamaulipas, to Vicente González Garcilazo and María Caballero Garza. She completed primary school in Padilla, Tamaulipas, and then moved to Ciudad Victoria where she attended the Teachers' Normal School and graduated with teaching credentials. Her family moved to Mexico City and González continued her education at the School of Higher Studies and the National Conservatory of Music. She earned a Bachelor of Arts degree, later enrolled in the Escuela Superior to study English, and married the historian Luis Castillo Ledón. She founded the Teatro de Masas and began publishing her writings with the release of Cuando las hojas caen in 1929.

She was the founder and chair of Club Internacional de Mujeres (1932) and the Ateneo Mexicano de Mujeres (1937) both of which were organized to help secure suffrage for Mexican women. In 1939, she was named as the representative for Mexico to the Inter-American Commission of Women (CIM). In the early 1940s, she was associated with the journal Hogar and in 1946–52, González was a columnist for Excélsior. She sponsored the creation of comedy theaters and acted in the first season. She also organized the company to present recreaciones populares ("popular recreations"), giving short theatrical performances in gardens, employment facilities, penal establishments and schools. They also gave such performances in tents in some of the populous slum areas.

In 1945, she served on the delegation that went to San Francisco to develop the Charter of the United Nations and pushed for the explicit recognition by the UN of the equality between women and men by lobbying Latin American delegates. In 1946, the Dominican Republic awarded her the Juan Pablo Duarte Decoration for her international service. In 1947, González was elected president of the CIM, and as such, when the organization moved under the umbrella of the Organization of American States (OAS), she helped draft the procedures for incorporating CIM into the OAS. In 1948, she became president of the women's section of the Party of the Mexican Revolution (PRM) which became the PRI and worked for securing women's right to vote, which was finally obtained in 1952 after González led a signature drive that collected 20,000 names.

She was Mexico's first female ambassador serving in many posts, including Sweden (1953), Switzerland (1957), Finland (1959), Austria (1965 to 1970) and the United Nations (1965). In 1958, President Adolfo López Mateos appointed her as the Undersecretary of Cultural Affairs of the Secretariat of Public Education, making her the first woman to hold that rank. In 1965 González was appointed as a representative to the International Atomic Energy Agency (IAEA) and in 1980, she became an advisor to the federal Secretariat of Tourism (SECTUR).

She died on 2 June 1986 in Mexico City. In 2012, her remains were interred at the Rotunda of Illustrious Persons.

== Selected works ==
González Caballero was an accomplished essayist and playwright.

=== Essays ===
- Cuatro estancias poéticas (1964)
- Viena, sitial de la música de todos los tiempos

=== Drama ===
- Cuando las hojas caen (1929)
- Cubos de Noria ( 1934)
- Coqueta (1945)
- Bajo el mismo techo (1945)
- Peligro - Deshielo (1963)
- La verdad escondida (1963)
