= Marie Yanick Mezile =

Haitian women's right advocate

Marie Yanick Mézile is a Haitian women's rights advocate. She was the Minister for the Status of Women and Women's Rights from 2013 until January 2015.

== Career ==
Marie Yanick Mézile is a former mayor of Port-au-Prince, former mayor of Delmas, and former Vice President of the Haitian Tèt Kale Party.

Marie Yanick Mezile obtained degrees in both secretarial studies and accounting at the Julien Craan Business School, which she attended between 1983 and 1987. She studied at the Ecole Hôtelière d'Haiti, where she obtained a diploma in 1988. From September 1990 to April 1992, she studied SME management at Jackson State University in Mississippi.

After her academic studies, Mézile held the position of Head of Social Services at the Catholic Institution for Aid to the Needy (ICHAN, NGO) from 1983 to 1986. In 1989, she founded the Center Technique de Typing, which she directed until 2001. From 1986 to 1991, she served as Party Secretary: Movement for the Establishment of Democracy in Haiti (MIDH) and, in 1992 and 1993 held the position of Secretary in the Private Secretariat of Prime Minister Marc Louis Bazin, at the National Palace.

From 2007 to 2008, she was a Member of the Presidential Commission on the amendment of the 1987 Constitution. She has held the office of Liaison Manager at SOGECARTE with the Haitian Informal Sector, responsible for the supervision of the integration of women traders into the banking sector. In April 2004, she ran for the position of Member of the Municipal Commission of Port-au-Prince, in charge of Social Affairs and Public Markets, where she remained until September 2005.

== Personal life ==
Marie Yanick Mezile has 2 daughters, Dominique Karenn Petit-Frere and Evika Mezile.

Between 2008 and 2011, she was both Member of the Board of the Chamber of Conciliation and Arbitration of Haiti; (CCIH), responsible for the Management of the Fund granted by the IDB for the Institutional and Organizational Strengthening of the Haitian Federation of Small and Medium Enterprises (FHAPME), and responsible for Focus Group in charge of the evaluation in partnership with USAID Winner losses incurred by Women Entrepreneurs victims of the earthquake of January 12, 2010

Yanick Mezile is President - Founder of the Haitian Federation of Small and Medium Enterprises (FHAPME) and President / Founder of the Association of Informal Sector Traders (ACSI), the two largest associations of traders and entrepreneurs in Haiti. In this context, in July 1998 it organized a Seminar for traders in the Informal sector in partnership with the Office of SEMA (Société d'Etudes de Marché et d'Analyse) with the aim of integrating them into the banking system; in 2007, it made its contribution to the granting of loans followed by training in SME management to 690 traders from funding from the Center for the Management of Local Funds for Canadian Cooperation in Haiti (CGF). And continuing this momentum, she worked to open access to credit to more than 150 women entrepreneurs who were victims of the earthquake of January 12, 2012 through a "KREDI CHO" program developed between FONKOZE and ACSI (Association of Traders of Integrated Sector) between 2006 and 2007 and gave impetus, in August 2010, to the construction through the FHAPME of 200 Sheds for the benefit of Traders victims of the earthquake of January 12, 2010 in the Hyppolite Markets of Port-au- Prince and Léogane with financing from the IDB.
