= Margarita Robles de Mendoza =

Mexican feminist and suffragette

- Born: Margarita Robles Díaz; 28 September 1896; Mexico City, Mexico
- Died: 1954 (aged 57–58); Mexico City, Mexico
- Occupations: writer, journalist, feminist, suffragette
- Years active: 1917-1954

Margarita Robles de Mendoza (née Díaz; 8 September 1896 – 1954) was a Mexican feminist and suffragette. She was one of the most vocal proponents for Mexican women's enfranchisement during the 1930s and 1940s and often seen as controversial. She worked as a journalist and wrote books about women's citizenship and used her social position to write letters to government officials. She founded the Unión de Mujeres Americanas (UMA) (Union of American Women) to promote women's civic and political equality throughout the Americas. She led the Feminine Sector of the National Revolutionary Party (PNRSF), served as Mexico's representative on the Inter-American Commission of Women from 1930-1940, and served in the consulate office in Mexico's Foreign Service from 1941 until her retirement.

== Biography ==
Robles was born on Margarita Robles Díaz on 28 September 1896 in Mexico City, Mexico to Pedro Robles and Elisa Díaz. During the Mexican Revolution, Robles, like many young women, distributed propaganda. She attended her father's alma mater, the Methodist Normal College of Puebla, and earned her teaching certificate. Then in 1921 she graduated from Pomona College in Claremont, California with a degree as an educational psychologist, and began teaching in California. As early as 1922 when she published a pamphlet entitled "The Political Rights of the Mexican Women", Robles was involved in the fight for suffrage. She married the lawyer Salvador Mendoza and in 1924 gave birth to a son, Guillermo Mendoza. From the time of her marriage, she adopted her husband's name.

In the late 1920s, Robles lived in New York working for the Mexican Secretary of Education and petitioned the president Emilio Portes Gil for remuneration of her war service, without success. In 1928, she was sent to the southwestern US and worked the states between Texas and California promoting schools for Mexicans. In 1930, she was selected as Mexico's representative to the Inter-American Commission of Women (CIM). By the early 1930s, she was back in New York and writing articles for newspapers and magazines. She published three books: La evolución de la mujer en México (1931), a compilation of her lectures; Ciudadanía de la mujer mexicana (1932), a treatise on Mexican women's citizenship; and that same year Silabario de la ciudadanía de la mujer mexicana, a syllabary of citizenship rights of Mexican women. She was one of the most outspoken Mexican feminists during this period and used her family's societal position to exchange correspondence with government officials. In March 1932 she wrote a letter to Jefe Máximo Plutarco Elías Calles "The Meaning of the Women's Vote in Mexico" arguing in favor of civic equality. In 1933 she attended the Pan-American Conference in Montevideo and questioned why marriage subordinated women to men, even registering the hotel room for her and her husband in her name, and in 1935 she complained to President Lázaro Cárdenas that labor protections for women included language about motherhood forcing them into inferior roles.

In 1934, she founded the Unión de Mujeres Americanas (UMA) (Union of American Women) to fight for the civic and political rights of women throughout the Americas and improve women's social and economic situations. She served as first chair along with an international board which initially had representatives from Cuba, the Dominican Republic, Peru and Venezuela and soon spread to all the Latin American Countries. Robles joined the National Revolutionary Party in 1936, as the party promised to reform Article 34 of the constitution and grant women the vote. During this period, she lived part-time in New York, and part-time in Mexico City where she kept an office from which she ran a campaign to educate women about their political rights and participated in rallies giving speeches about the vote. Robles was an active member of the Frente Unico Para los Derechos de Mujer (Sole Front for Women's Rights) and in 1937 she brought representatives of the US National Woman's Party on a tour through Mexico, which culminated in a meeting in Mexico City with 25 members of FUPDM. By 1938, she was the head of the Feminine Sector of the National Revolutionary Party (PNRSF).

In 1939, an amendment was passed to Article 34 of the Mexican Constitution granting enfranchisement to women, but required ratification by 28 states. In 1940, Robles admonished President Cárdenas' administration for failing to press for ratification and urged him to enact the legislation. In 1940, Amalia González Caballero de Castillo Ledón replaced Robles as Mexico's representative to the CIM and Robles became the third chancellor of Mexico's Foreign Service, serving at the Mexican Consulate in New York. In 1946, she was promoted to second chancellor and was relocated Detroit, Michigan. Robles was a somewhat polarizing figure. Often her efforts were seen by her Mexican peers as imperialistic agenda-pushing with a US perspective. On the other hand, leaders from the US, like Doris Stevens, who chaired the CIM questioned whether she was devoted to the "cause" or wanted personal recognition.

She retired to Mexico City and spent her time writing until her death in 1954.

== Selected works ==
- La evolución de la mujer en México México: Imp. Galas (1931)
- Silabario de la ciudadanía de la mujer mexicana Jalapa-Enriquez: Talleres Tip. del Gobierno (1932)
- Ciudadanía de la mujer mexicana Morelia, Mexico: A. Obregon (1932)
