= Oliveira Lima =

Brazilian writer, librarian, literary critic, diplomat, historian and journalist

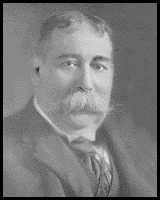

Ambassador of Brazil to the United States
- In office May 19, 1898 – June 5, 1898

Personal details
- Born: December 25, 1867 Brazil
- Died: March 24, 1928 (aged 60) Washington, D. C., U.S.

Manuel de Oliveira Lima (December 25, 1867 – March 24, 1928) was a Brazilian writer, literary critic, diplomat, historian, and journalist.

Manuel de Oliveira Lima was born in Recife, state of Pernambuco, Empire of Brazil on December 25, 1867.

He represented Brazil in several countries and was a visiting professor at Harvard University. He acted as chargé d'affaires to the United States from May 19 to June 5, 1898.

He was a founding member of the Brazilian Academy of Letters.

Passionate about books, he collected them throughout his life and assembled the third largest collection on Brazil, losing only to the National Library of Brazil and to the library of the University of São Paulo. The Oliveira Lima Library, located at the Catholic University of America, Washington, US, has 58,000 books in addition to correspondence exchanged with intellectuals, more than six hundred paintings and countless albums of clippings with newspaper news. It is part of the collection also one of the three busts of Dom Pedro I sculpted by Marc Ferrez (uncle of the eponymous photographer), the only one of the three made in bronze.

He died in Washington, D.C., on March 24, 1928.
