= Flora de Oliveira Lima =

Brazilian socialite

- Born: 1863; Vitória de Santo Antão, Pernambuco, Brazil
- Died: 1940 (aged 76–77); Washington, D.C., United States
- Occupation: Socialite
- Spouse: Manoel de Oliveira Lima

Flora de Oliveira Lima (née Cavalcanti de Albuquerque; 1863 – 1940) was a Brazilian socialite, diplomat's wife and daughter of a wealthy planter. She spent her life following her husband's diplomatic appointments and collecting books. Upon her husband's death in 1928, she became the assistant librarian of the Oliveira Lima Library (sometimes referred to as the Ibero American Library) at The Catholic University of America in Washington, DC. In 1930, she became the Brazilian designee of the Inter-American Commission of Women.

== Biography ==
Flora Cavalcanti de Albuquerque was born in 1863 in at the Cachoeirinha sugar mill, located in Vitória de Santo Antão, Pernambuco Brazil to aristocratic mill owners who owned a sugar plantation in the state. On her father's side, the Cavalcanti family is the largest family in Brazil deriving from a single immigrant, Florentine nobleman, Filippo Cavalcanti. On her mother's side, she descended from Henrique Marques Lins, first Viscount of Utinga. As a daughter of the aristocracy, she was educated at home, studying English and French and being trained as the wife of a public official, who would have social duties to help construct and mold the national identity. At the age of 28, in 1891, she married Oliveira Lima (1867-1928), giving the trader's son, social status, which resulted in a diplomatic posts in Lisbon, Berlin, Washington DC, London, Tokyo, Caracas, Brussels and Stockholm. Serving as her husband's hostess and secretary, de Oliveira Lima had a wide correspondence with some of the literary figures of her day, including Max Fleiuss, with whom she corresponded until her death. Some of the parties she had initially met through her husband, but who remained in her intellectual and social network were Machado de Assis, Afonso Celso de Assis Figueiredo Júnior, Fidelino de Figueiredo, Augusto Tasso Fragoso, Peruvian Minister Víctor M. Maúrtua, and Dr. James Brown Scott, among many others.

De Oliveira Lima became an accomplished linguist and spoke five languages, including Portuguese, Spanish, English, French and German. She helped him amass a collection of 45,000 books and served as his archivist, organizer and photographer. In 1916, a decision was made to donate the library which contained many original sources, and collections of both historic and literary import to Portuguese Brazilian culture. In 1920, after securing agreement from the Catholic University of America that the library would remain a separate, autonomous facility and that he would be the first librarian, the couple left Europe and moved to Washington, DC. Manoel managed the library until his death in 1928, whereupon Flora took over managing the collection. Under her direction, the collection grew to 58,000 volumes. When the Inter-American Commission of Women was forming, de Oliveira Lima was recommended for Brazil's delegate by Peruvian Minister Víctor Maúrtua and appointed by the Government of Brazil as the Brazilian Commissioner in 1930. During the 1930s, she also organized and edited Manoel's memoirs with Gilberto Freyre, with whom the childless couple had developed a mentoring relationship.

De Oliveira Lima served on the library staff until her death in 1940 in Washington, DC.
