= Elena Mederos =

Cuban activist, feminist and social reformer (1900–1981)

Elena Inés Mederos y Cabañas de González (13 January 1900 – 25 September 1981) was a Cuban human rights and women's rights activist, a feminist, defender of the LGBTQ+ community and social reformer. She was the first Minister of Social Work in Cuba.

Mederos founded several organizations including the School of Social Services at the University of Havana; the Foundation for Social Services, which developed programs for children's organizations in Cuba; "Of Human Rights" (New York City, 1961); and a Cuban exile lobby that worked for the release of political prisoners. A suffragist, Mederos was a co-founder of the Alianza Nacional Feminista, a suffragist organization active in Cuba during the 1920s. She was the founding vice president of the National Association of Cuban American Women (NACAW). Mederos is "considered the most prominent Cuban woman of the 20th century".

== Early and personal life ==
Mederos was born in Havana on 13 January 13, 1900. Her father, a well-to-do tobacco merchant, gave Mederos and her sister tobacco estates, which allowed each of the daughters to live a comfortable life without dependence on a husband for financial support. Her education included a Ph.D. in pharmacology. She married Hilario González Arrieta, a young lawyer, in 1924.

== Work ==
The Sixth Pan American Union conference was held in 1928 in Havana. Attended by a large assembly of Cuban women led by Mederos, the conference established the Inter-American Commission of Women (CIM). Representing Cuba, Mederos was a member of the first CIM conference which met in Havana in 1930. In September 1959, Mederos served for five months as first Minister of Social Work in Cuba, under Fidel Castro's provisional government. She arrived in the US in 1961 with her daughter María Elena González Mederos, where she worked for UNICEF. Mederos died 25 September 1981 in Washington, DC. The Elena Mederos Award was established in her honor by the NACAW.

== Bibliography ==
- Pedraza, Silvia (17 September 2007). Political Disaffection in Cuba's Revolution and Exodus. Cambridge University Press. ISBN 978-0-521-86787-0.
- Ruiz, Vicki L.; Korrol, Virginia Sánchez (3 May 2006). Latinas in the United States, set: A Historical Encyclopedia. Indiana University Press. ISBN 0-253-11169-2.
- Smith, Bonnie G. (2008). The Oxford Encyclopedia of Women in World History: 4 Volume Set. Oxford University Press, USA. ISBN 978-0-19-514890-9.
- Stoner, Kathryn Lynn (9 May 1991). From the House to the Streets: The Cuban Woman's Movement for Legal Reform, 1898–1940. Duke University Press. ISBN 0-8223-8168-0.
- US Congress (January 2011). Congressional Record, V. 153, PT. 6, March 26, 2007 to April 17, 2007. Government Printing Office. ISBN 978-0-16-087164-1.
