= Women's Party of Chile =

- Leader: María de la Cruz Toledo
- Founded: 1946
- Dissolved: 1954
- Ideology: Feminism; Ibañism; Women's suffrage

The Feminist Party of Chile was a Chilean political party, created in 1946 and active until 1954. Its goals were to obtain women's suffrage in Chile, which was granted in 1949.

== History ==
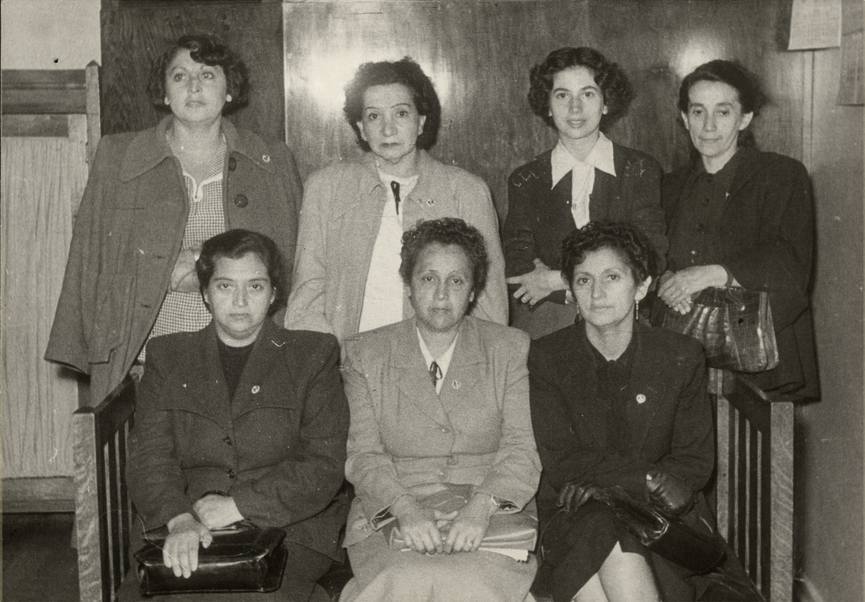
Party members

The party was formed in 1946 by María de la Cruz Toledo. It is possible that at its peak the party consisted of 27 thousand members.

In 1951, the group fractured when De la Cruz tried to impose her favored candidate for the presidency of the party in Magallanes Region. The group headed by Nery Hamuy formed the Progressive Women's Party.

In 1952, the party supported Carlos Ibáñez del Campo and tipped the scales in his favor within women, who were voting for the first time. In the parliamentary elections of 1953 a female deputy was elected, and in the by-election to choose the successor of Carlos Ibáñez, María de la Cruz became the first female senator of Chile, but was later disqualified by the rest of the Senate.

There is evidence that the party received money from the Argentine Peronist Party. According to the writer and former party leader, Matilde Ladrón de Guevara, the leaders traveled constantly to Argentina between 1950 and 1960 to seek funds that were later not deposited in the party's coffers. María de la Cruz, in the midst of an anti-Peronist movement in Chilean politics, was discharged from her position as senator for these criminal acts, although the Courts later declared her innocent.

== Election results ==
=== Parliamentary elections ===
Election	Representatives			Senators		
Election	Votes	% of votes	Seats	Votes	% of votes	Seats
1953	8972	1.15%	0 / 147	Did not participate		1 / 50

== See also ==
- Partido Cívico Femenino
- Unión Femenina de Chile
- Pro-Emancipation Movement of Chilean Women (MEMCH)
- Chilean Federation of Women's Institutions (FECHIF)
- Comité Nacional pro Derechos de la Mujer
- Asociación de Mujeres Universitarias
- National Council of Women (Chile)

== Footnotes and references ==
=== Bibliography ===
- Gaviola Artigas, Edda; Ximena Jiles M., Lorella Lopestri M. y Claudia Rojas M. 1986. Queremos votar en las próximas elecciones. Historia del movimiento femenino chileno 1913-1952 (in Spanish). Santiago. Archived from the original on 7 October 2007.
- Urzúa Valenzuela, Germán (1992). Historia política de Chile y su evolución electoral desde 1810 a 1992 (in Spanish). Santiago: Editorial Jurídica de Chile.
