= Feminism in Chile =

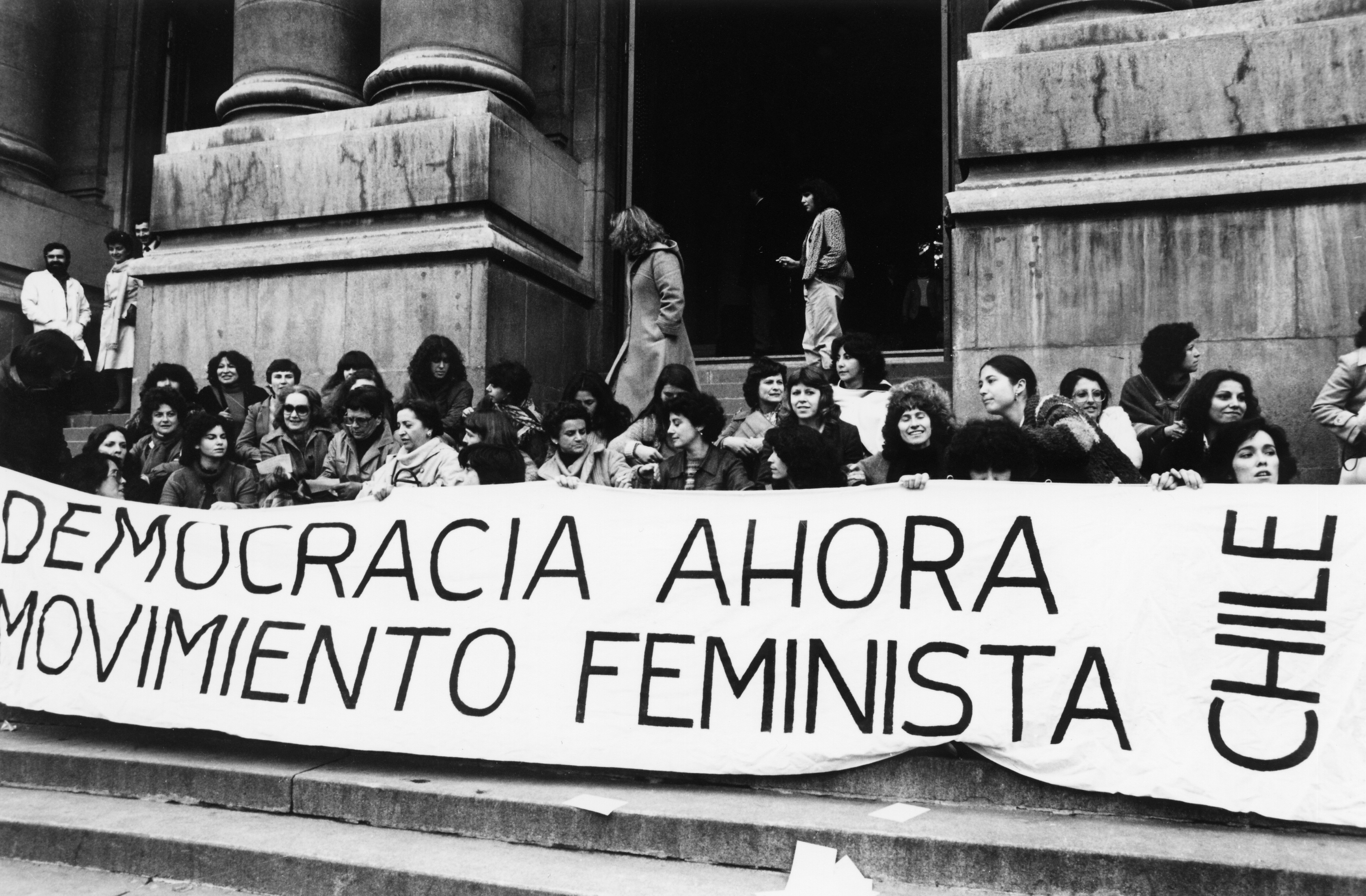
Chilean women protest against the Pinochet regime

Feminism in Chile has its own liberation language and activist strategies for rights that is shaped by the political, economic, and social system of Chile. Beginning in the 19th century, Chilean women have been organizing with aspirations of asserting their political rights. These aspirations have had to work against the reality that Chile is one of the most socially conservative countries in Latin America. The Círculo de Estudios de la Mujer (Women's Studies Circle) is one example of a pioneering women's organization during the Pinochet dictatorship (1973–1989) which redefined women's responsibilities and rights, linking mothers' rights to women's rights and women's civil liberties. The founding members of the Círculo de Estudios de La Mujer consisted of a small group of Santiago feminists who were from the Academia de Humanismo Cristiano. These women gathered "to discuss the situation of women in Chile", their first meeting drew a crowd of over 300 participants and from there challenged the authoritarian life in Santiago. These women helped shape the rights for women in Chile.

== Early history of feminism in Chile ==
With the strong influence of Catholicism in Chile, some of the first feminist movements ironically came from socially conservative women. In 1912, upper-class women began to advocate for working-class women in a way that was favorable to conservative groups of the time. The first female organizations that came to be in Chile started around 1915, but unlike many other countries and their groups, these women were most likely to be in the upper middle class. As such, they were largely able to put together these groups where exploration of the interest in feminism came to be by shedding particular light on the issues that middle to upper-class feminists found to be the most important. One of the earliest examples of this in Chilean history occurred on June 17, 1915, when a young university student, and later a diplomat and suffragist, named Amanda Labarca decided to start a group called the Círculo de Lectura, where she was able to promote Chilean culture towards women. With this, she was able to bring together positivity and change within the women in her community because she strived to ensure that all women could be given a chance to have their voices heard, through education, regardless of their affiliations and social status. Early feminism in Chile also took notes on the international feminist mobilizations, while catering to Chile's specific culture. For example, feminists such as Amanda Labarca promoted a domestic form of feminism which was sensitive to the socially and politically conservative governmental powers of the time. Generally speaking, this was what was seen as the beginning of first-wave feminism amongst Chilean women.

== History ==
The most compactly organized feminist movement in South America in the early 20th century was in Chile. There were three large organizations which represented three different classes of people: the Club de Señoras of Santiago represented the more prosperous women; the Consejo Nacional de Mujeres represented the working class, such as schoolteachers; other laboring women organized another active society for the improvement of general educational and social conditions. The Circulo de Lectura de Señoras was founded in 1915 in Santiago Chile by Delia Matte de Izquierdo. Only one month later, the Club de Señoras was created and founded by Amanda Labarca. Women such as Amanda Labarca were particularly successful in their feminist efforts mainly due to some of their international contacts and experiences resulting from studying abroad.

While Chile was very conservative socially and ecclesiastically during this time, its educational institutions were opened to women since around the 1870s. When Sarmiento as an exile was living in Santiago, he recommended the liberal treatment of women and their entrance into the university. This latter privilege was granted while Miguel Luis Amunategui was minister of education. In 1859, when a former minister of education opened a contest for the best paper on popular education, Amunategui received the prize. Among the things which he advocated in that paper was the permitting of women to enter the university, an idea which he had received from Sarmiento. The development of women's education was greatly delayed by the war between Chile, Peru, and Bolivia. President Balmaceda was a great friend of popular education. Under him, the first national high school, or "liceo," for girls was opened, about 1890. This first wave of feminism began in about 1884. Chile was one of the first Latin American countries to admit women to institutions of higher education as well as to send women abroad to study. By the 1920s, there were 49 national "liceos" for girls, all directed by women. Besides these, there were two professional schools for young women in Santiago and one in each Province.

The Consejo Nacional de Mujeres maintained a home for girls attending the university in Santiago, and helped the women students in the capital city. There were nearly a 1,000 young women attending the University of Chile in the early 20th century. The conservative element of this club focused primarily on pursuing women's intellectual work, while later on, Consejo Nacional took more progressive ideas into account. Their members consisted of impressive middle class, aristocratic, woman who had a great deal of influence on their communities, including government and private sectors. Labarca wrote several interesting volumes— such as, Actividades femeninas en Estados Unidos (1915), and ¿A dónde va la mujer? (1934). She was accompanied in her work by a circle of women, most, of whom were connected with educational work in Chile. Several women's periodicals were published in Chile during this period, one of note being El Pefleca, directed by Elvira Santa Cruz. Labarca is perhaps considered one of Chile's most prominent feminist leaders.

In a 1922 address given before the Club de Señoras of Santiago, Chilean publisher Ricardo Salas Edwards stated the following: "There have been manifested during the last 25 years phenomena of importance that have bettered woman's general culture and the development of her independence. Among them were the spread of establishments for the primary and secondary education of women; the occupations that they have found themselves as the teachers of the present generation, which can no longer entertain a doubt of feminine intellectual capacity; the establishment of great factories and commercial houses, which have already given her lucrative employment, independent of the home; the organization of societies and clubs; and, finally, artistic and literary activities, or the catholic social action of the highest classes of women, which has been developed as a stimulus to the entire sex during recent years."

Amanda Labarca initially thought that asking for suffrage in Chile was inappropriate. In 1914, she wrote, "I am not a militant feminist, nor am I a suffragist, for above all I am Chilean, and in Chile today the vote for women is out of order." This sentiment began to change as the post-World War I economic crisis hit, and more and more women were pushed into the working class. In order to complement this new economic responsibility, women began to fight for political, legal, and economic rights. In 1919, Labarca transformed the Ladies Reading Circle into the National Women's Council, which was informed by international women's councils. A new political body was formed in the early 1920s under the name of the Progressive Feminist Party with the purpose of gaining all the rights claimed by women. The platform was:

1. The right to the municipal and parliamentary vote and to eligibility for office.
2. The publishing of a list of women candidates of the party for public offices.
3. The founding of a ministry of public welfare and education, headed by a woman executive, to protect women and children and to improve living conditions.

The founders of the party (middle-class women) carried on a quiet and cautious campaign throughout the country. No distinction was made between the social positions of party adherents, the cooperation of all branches of feminine activity being sought to further the ends of the party. The press investigated public opinion regarding the new movement. Congress had already received favorably a bill to yield civil and legal rights to women. The greatest pressure was brought to bear to obtain the concession of legal rights to women to dispose of certain property, especially the product of their own work, and the transference to the mother, in the father's absence, of the power to administer the property of the child and the income therefrom until the minor's majority. It was understood that concession of these rights would elevate the authority of the mother and bring more general consideration for women, as well as benefits to family life and social welfare.

One group that stands out in particular as a historical cornerstone of feminism in Chile is the Movement for the Emancipation of Chilean Women (MEMCh). Founded in 1935 by influential feminists such as Marta Vergara, MEMCh fought for the legal, economic, and reproductive emancipation of women as well as their community involvement to improve social conditions. MEMCh produced an inspiring monthly bulletin (La Mujer Nueva) that contextualized the work being done in Chile with international feminism. While feminism in Chile of a decade earlier had focused on more nationalistic and religious goals, MEMCh initiated a connectedness between South and North American women, in defense of democracy.

In December 1948, the Chilean Congress had approved a bill granting full political rights to the women of Chile.

During Pinochet's dictatorship throughout the late 1970s and early 1980s, coalitions and federations of women's groups—not all of which necessarily designated themselves in name as feminists—gathered in kitchens, living rooms, and other non-political arenas to devise strategies of bringing down the dictator's rule. During his presidency, the second wave of feminism was occurring. Because political movements, mostly male-dominated, were oppressed nearly out of existence during the dictatorship, women gathered in a political manner outside of what was traditionally male. Through this they created grassroots organizations such as Moviemento pro emancipación de la Mujer that is credited with directly influencing the downfall of Pinochet. Pinochet's rule also involved mass exile—an estimation of over 200,000 by 1980. While Chilean women were living in exile in Vancouver, Canada, a feminist magazine created by Latinas, called Aquelarre began to circulate widely.

There were a variety of reasons that women sought to gain more freedom. One of the reasons consisted on the fact that Chilean women were trying to mirror the independence that women had in North America during the Industrial era. Women were eager to work, and make money. However, there was a very large belief that if women worked, then households would fall apart. Some of the strategic preferences that allowed for women's rights was autonomy, double militancy, and integration.

Even within the feminist community in Chile, there is an overall disagreement as to how feminism has been affected by democracy post dictatorship. Even though more feminist policies were put in place during the 1990s, feminists paradoxically largely lost their voices politically. This reconfiguration of the feminist movement post dictatorship has posed certain challenges to the advancement of feminist ideals. There has been a general trend towards disregarding this moment in the history of feminism in Chile even though there were significant organizations who continued to work towards liberation. In the 1990s, there was often a dichotomy between groups that worked within institutions to instill change, and those who wanted to distance their motives as far away from the patriarchy as possible. While the privileged professors of newly established gender and women's studies programs in universities were given more of a say, the average citizens found that their voices were often muffled and restrained by institutionalized feminism.

Chile made marital rape illegal in 1999.

More recently, the Chilean women's movements continue to advocate for their rights and participation in all levels of the democratic society and through non-governmental organizations. Similarly, a large political barrier for women was broken when Michelle Bachelet became Chile's first female president. Laura Albornoz was also delegated as Minister of Women's Affairs during Bachelet's first term as president. This position's duties includes running the Servicio Nacional de la Mujer or the National Women's Service. Servicio Nacional de la Mujer (SERNAM) - protects women's legal rights in the public sector. In the beginning of its creation, some opinions were that SERNAM organization was said to have weakened the women's rights agenda due because it wasn't successful at policy influence. The organization was later found to be successful at creating programs and legislation that promoted the protection of women's rights at work, school and worked to criminalize domestic violence and protection. The success of this organization is debated, but it has made substantial moves to publicize the issues women face across Chile.

Motherhood has also been an important aspect of the feminist movement in Chile. Due to the vast influence of Catholicism in the country, the first (1940s) women's centers for mothering began with religious motives. Most of these centers, however, were catered to upper-class women, leaving the poorest women the least supported. The CEMA Chile (Center for Mothers) was created in 1954, to "provide spiritual and material well-being to the Chilean women". CEMA worked, more so than other women's centers, to provide services for underprivileged women in Chile. Through motherhood, the Chilean woman has been politicized- not only is she ridiculed for overpopulating a country while given minimal means of reproductive support, but she is also taken as a passive object of governance.

The parity promoted by Bachelet did not survive her. Half of the ministries in her first government were occupied by women; in her successor's team, Sebastián Piñera, they barely reached 18%.

== Women's access to voting in Chile ==
Chile has been considered one of the most socially conservative countries in Latin America. This has been exemplified by women's struggle to gain freedom in terms of voting. The Chilean government esteems Catholicism, which puts women in a patriarchal, domesticated setting, and has been used as reasoning for restricting women's rights. Even though the first woman (Domitila Silva Y Lepe) voted in 1875, voting was still considered a barrier well into the 1900s to women's rights in Chile. By 1922, Graciela Mandujano and other women founded the Partido Cívico Femenino (Women's Civic Party) which focused on women getting the right to vote. Women formally gained the right to vote in 1949. During that time, women and men voted in separate polling stations due to an effort to provide women with less influence on their preferences. Women also tended to vote more conservatively than men, demonstrating the influence of religion on voting preferences. Although most organizations dissolved after suffrage was granted, Partido Femenino Chileno (Chilean Women's Party), founded by María de la Cruz in 1946, continued to grow and work for more women's rights throughout the years. Chilean women's influence on politics has been demonstrated through multiple occasions during presidential elections - for example, had women not voted in the 1958 election, Salvador Allende would have won. During Chile's dictatorship (1973-1990), developments in regards to women's rights stalled comparatively. This did not stop some feminist groups from speaking out, however, as exemplified by the women's march of 1971 against Salvador Allende. This march had long-lasting effects, particularly by establishing women's role in politics, and turning the day of the march into National Women's Day. Post dictatorship, women paradoxically also seemed to lose their voice politically. With a more recent surge in feminism in Chile, the first female leader, Michelle Bachelet, became the 34th president in 2006–2010. While not immediately re-electable for the next election, she was appointed the first executive director of United Nations Entity for Gender Equality and the Empowerment of Women (UN Women). On March 11, 2014, she became the 36th president, beginning her second term.

== Leaders of the feminist movement in Chile ==
Julieta Kirkwood, born in 1937, was considered the founder of the feminist movement of the 1980s and an instigator of the organization of gender studies at universities in Chile. After studying at the University of Chile, she was influenced by the 1968 revolution in France. At the core of her ideologies was the mantra, ‘There is no democracy without feminism”. Influenced by the ideologies of sociologist Enzo Faletto, she contributed to FLACSO’s theoretical framework of rebellious practices in the name of feminism. Kirkwood not only theorized, but also practiced a life full of activism – being a part of MEMCh 83 as well as the Center for Women's Studies. She also wrote opinionated pieces in a magazine called Furia. Her book, Ser política en Chile, framed how academia has contributed to the social movements of the 1980s. She argued for equal access to scientific knowledge for women, as well as advocating for a more just educational system.

Amanda Labarca was one of the pioneering feminists in Chile and paved the way for what feminism is today.

== 2018 feminist wave ==
The Ni una menos and Me Too movements generated Chilean marches in November 2016, March 2017 and October 2017 to protest violence against women. Following Sebastián Piñera's assumption of the Presidency in March 2018, women's marches and university occupations were expanded from April to June 2018 to protest against machismo, domestic violence and sexual harassment and sexist behaviour in universities and schools, and for abortion rights.

== See also ==
- A Rapist in Your Path
- Feminism in Latin America
- Feminism in Argentina
- Feminism in Mexico
- Women in Chile

== Sources ==
- This article incorporates text from Bulletin of the Pan American Union, Volume 54, by Pan American Union, a publication from 1922, now in the public domain in the United States.
- This article incorporates text from Bulletin of the Pan American Union, Volume 54, by Pan American Union, a publication from 1922 now in the public domain in the United States.
- Dandavati, Annie G. (2005). Engendering Democracy In Chile. New York, New York: Peter Lang Publishing. pp. 130, 133. ISBN 0-8204-6143-1.
- http://www.coha.org/chile-coha%E2%80%99s-women%E2%80%99s-studies-series-sernam-and-the-underrepresentation-of-women-in-chile/
- https://www.npr.org/2012/10/27/163778756/on-womens-rights-chile-is-full-of-contradictions
