= María Rivera Urquieta =

Chilean professor and feminist

- Born: María Mercedes Rivera Urquieta; 12 June 1894; Vallenar, Atacama Province, Chile
- Occupations: Educator and feminist
- Years active: 1914–1949?

María Rivera Urquieta (born 1894) was a Chilean professor and feminist. She was one of the founding members of the Pro-Emancipation Movement of Chilean Women (Spanish: Movimiento Pro-Emancipación de las Mujeres de Chile (MEMCH)). She was a lecturer for the Chilean Federation of Feminine Institutions and led one of the conference meetings at the Primer Congreso Interamericano de Mujeres held in Guatemala City, Guatemala in 1947.

== Biography ==
María Mercedes Rivera Urquieta was born on 12 June 1894 in Vallenar, in what was at the time Atacama Province, Chile but is now in Huasco Province, to Tobias Rivera Iriarte and Petronila Urquieta Mondaca.

Rivera was one of the first members of the Pro-Emancipation Movement of Chilean Women (MEMCH) which was begun on 11 May 1935 by Elena Caffarena, who invited fellow "adventurers" to join in her feminist ideal. Besides Rivera, who was listed as "doctora", the founding members were: attorney, Flora Heredia; Chief Inspector and director of women workers, Clara Williams; journalist, Marta Vergara; professors, Aída Parada, Domitila Ulloa and Susana Depassier; trade union organizers, Eulogia Román and María Ramírez; Angelina Matte; Graciela Mandujano; Felisa Vergara; Olga Poblete and Herta Hoschhauser, Elena’s best friend.

In 1946, with the support of the Chilean Federation of Feminine Institutions, MEMCH sponsored a series of lectures at the University of Chile on a diverse set of topics including Chilean History, the Constitution, Democracy, Economy, Education, Health and Politics. Collaborators in the presentations were Rivera and Graciela Mandujano, Aída Parada, Olga Poblete, and Eulogia Román. Lively debate followed each presentation.

She was one of the attendees of the Primer Congreso Interamericano de Mujeres held in Guatemala City, Guatemala in 1947. Each of the women attending were representatives for organizations which they belonged to in their own countries. Rivera was the representative for numerous organizations including the Asociaciones Cristianas Femeninas, Círculo Pro Paz y de Cooperación Americana, Consejo Nacional de Mujeres and Federación Chilena Femenina (casilla 1214, Valparaíso).

During the conference, she led the discussion on nuclear power and the ramifications the use of the atomic bomb. They discussed many aspects of the threat of nuclear weaponry and urged as one of their 8 recommendations that all steps be taken ensure that nuclear weapons were not used again, including destroying all existing weapons and the manufacturing plants that produced them. In addition, they recommended a broad education program so that all members of society, including children and the elderly understood both the benefits and dangers of nuclear power. Finally, they urged that the United Nations appoint pacifist women to posts to help regulate and monitor all aspects of the atomic industry including financing, production and raw materials, in an effort to prevent any further atomic war.

On 8 January 1949 when the president of Chile finally signed into law the bill giving women the right to vote, none of the feminists who had worked for suffrage were allowed to attend the ceremony. They listened at home on their radios as the names of the legislators and the feminists who had fought for 35 years were read..."Amanda Labarca, Elcira Vergara, Marta Correa, Maria de Hidalgo, Felisa Vergara, María de Arancibia Laso, Elena Caffarena, Raquel García, Flor Heredia, Aída Yávar, María Rivera, Magaly Negroni, Marta Ossa, María Aguirre, Marta Vergara, Graciela Lacoste, Graciela Mandujano ...".
