= Irma Salas Silva =

Chilean educator

- Born: 11 March 1903; Santiago, Chile
- Died: 28 April 1987 (aged 84)
- Education: Columbia University
- Occupation: Educator
- Awards: Andrés Bello Prize (1983)

Irma Salas Silva (11 March 1903 – 28 April 1987) was a distinguished Chilean educator. She was the first Chilean woman to earn a doctorate in education, obtained at Columbia University in 1930.

== Biography ==
Irma Salas was born in Santiago on 11 March 1903, the daughter of educator Darío Salas Díaz and Luisa Silva Molina. She followed in her father's footsteps, becoming a noted academic administrator. She was also an advocate for women's rights and education.

She died on 28 April 1987.

== Teaching career ==
Salas entered the Pedagogical Institute of the University of Chile, where she qualified as Professor of English in 1924. In 1927 she was sent by the government to complete her studies in the United States, where she received her doctorate in education from Columbia University in 1930. She was the first Chilean woman to earn this degree. Her thesis was titled The socio-economic composition of the high school population in Chile.

When she returned home, she joined the faculty of the Pedagogical Institute. She became one of the main promoters of pedagogical experimentation, taking part in the creation of the Liceo Experimental Manuel de Salas and serving as its director until 1943. There she implemented the educational principles of John Dewey.

After leaving the school in 1945, she was appointed president of the commission for the reform of the secondary school system, in charge of reformulating and rethinking Chilean secondary education. The commission proposed the creation of more experimental lyceums, beginning with six, then extending the reform to the rest. In 1953 President Carlos Ibáñez del Campo put a stop to the reform, so it was limited to the first seven schools. However, some elements of this reform, such as course councils, student centers, and chief teachers, were adopted by the Chilean secondary school system.

In 1946 Salas assumed leadership of the Department of Education of the University of Chile's Faculty of Philosophy and Education.

One of her professional goals was the expansion of the university to the regions of Chile. In 1960, under rector Juan Gómez Millas, Irma Salas implemented a program of university colleges, within the University of Chile, that offered short courses of study, in Temuco, La Serena, Osorno, Antofagasta, and other cities. In 1981 these would become public autonomous universities.

== Work for women's rights ==
In 1931, just after the fall of Carlos Ibáñez del Campo, Salas participated in the creation of the Association of University Women, within which she served as secretary of the first board of directors. The organization, which sought to extend and improve the cultural, economic, civic, and social opportunities of professional women and raise the living conditions of women in general, was driven mainly by Amanda Labarca, with Ernestina Pérez as president and Labarca and lawyer Elena Caffarena as vice-presidents.

In 1946 Salas reported, during the celebration of International Women's Day in the Chilean Federation of Women's Institutions, as a member of the Association of University Women, on the Women's Congress, held in Paris in 1945. In her speech she stated that "women had participated actively in the war effort, which had given them a new self-awareness and respect," and that they had learned "to convert the principles of democracy into reality for women".

== Honors ==
In 1953 Salas was appointed a UNESCO permanent specialist in education. In 1983 she received the Andrés Bello Inter-American Prize for Education, presented by the Organization of American States. The jury recognized

Dr. Salas' interest in the development of education in Latin America, which is reflected in her participation in programs, visits, meetings and advice on that discipline, carried out in many countries of the area, and the attention it provided, from her position of UNESCO permanent specialist in education, with headquarters in Paris, to facilitate and provide in a special way, technical assistance to the countries of that area.

The University of Chile awarded her the title of doctor honoris causa in 1981.

An elementary school, Escuela Irma Salas Silva, was named in her honor in Concón.
