= María Rivera =

María Rivera may refer to:

- María Rivera (swimmer) (born 1967), Mexican swimmer
- María Rivera (activist) (born 1958), Chilean activist
- María Antonia Rivera, vice president of Honduras
- María Rivera Urquieta (1894–?), Chilean professor and feminist
- María Elisa Rivera Díaz (1887–1981), Puerto Rican medical doctor
