= Julieta Kirkwood =

Chilean sociologist, political scientist, university professor and feminist activist

- Born: 5 April 1936
- Died: 8 April 1985 (aged 49)
- Occupation: sociologist
- Known for: Latin American Social Sciences Institute
- Notable work: Círculo de Estudios de la Mujer, MEMCh 83

María Julieta Kirkwood Bañados (5 April 1936 – 8 April 1985) was a Chilean sociologist, political scientist, university professor and feminist activist. Her activism led her to be involved with feminist organizations such as La Casa de la Mujer La Morada, Mujeres Por la Vida, and MEMCH-83(Movimiento Pro-Emancipación de la Mujer Chilena–1983). Over the course of her career she worked as a researcher and lecturer at the Facultad Latinoamericana de Ciencias Sociales (FLACSO) in Santiago, where she was among the few women political scientists of her generation. Her colleagues and students later recognized her contributions by preserving her teaching and writings, ensuring her influence on Chilean social science and feminism continued beyond her death. She is considered the forerunner of Gender studies in Chile.

== Early life ==
Julieta Kirkwood was born on 5 April 1936 in Santiago, Chile, to Julieta Bañados and John “Johnny” Kirkwood. She was raised in Santiago in a Chilean-British family that exposed her to diverse cultural influences from an early age. Kirkwood entered the University of Chile where she earned a degree in Public Administration in 1969. Her academic training provided the foundation for her later involvement in social research, in institutions like FLACSO. During these years she married Ramón Sabat Marcos, with whom she had her first son, Pablo. She later divorced Sabat Marcos and married Rodrigo Baño Ahumada with whom she had her second son, Rodrigo.

== Professional career ==
Kirkwood created theoretical and historical reference works in the field of the study of the feminist movement in Chile and in Latin America. Kirkwood’s professional activity combined scholarship and political engagement. At FLACSO, she contributed to collective research projects and began publishing studies on women’s political participation in the early 1980s. In the newly created Gender Studies Area in FLACSO, she produced some of the earliest Chilean research on women’s labor conditions, indigenous women, and the effects of poverty and patriarchal oppression on women’s everyday lives. Her work reflected the broader debates of Socialist Renewal, which sought to distance itself from orthodox Marxism and re‑evaluate democracy. She was part of the Federation of Socialist Women (1981-1984), a small group that participated in the National Women’s Meetings organized by the Women’s Department of the National Union Coordinator, helping to connect party politics with emerging feminist concerns.

== Feminist activism ==
During the military dictatorship of Chile, Kirkwood played a central role in building feminist organizations that operated outside state-controlled academic spaces. Among the organizations she played key roles in, only Círculo de Estudios de la Mujer had formal ties to academic spaces through its origins in FLACSO. She developed other organizations independently of university institutions, such as Furia magazine (published by the Federation of Socialist Women between 1981 and 1984), which included writings about feminism, socialism, and democracy under dictatorship. Using the pseudonym "Adela H.," she authored most of its editorials. The magazine circulated feminist analysis during a period of political oppression.

In 1979, she co-founded the Círculo de Estudios de la Mujer, an early space for theoretical discussion and research on women’s experiences in Chile. In 1983, she helped establish La Casa de la Mujer La Morada, often shortened to La Morada, a center dedicated to feminist education, social networks, and grassroots activism. Kirkwood contributed to the development of the Centro de Estudios de la Mujer (Center for Women Studies, CEM), created in 1984 as a continuation of the Círculo de Estudios de la Mujer, where she carried out extensive fieldwork and training programs for women from vulnerable areas. Through these organizations, Kirkwood helped expand feminist education and foster connections between middle-class feminist intellectuals and working-class women.

The Círculo also produced a regular bulletin that circulated twelve issues, linking feminist activism to human rights networks. That same year, 1983, Kirkwood attended the Second of the Latin American and Caribbean Feminist Encuentros in Lima, Peru where she strengthened her ties with other Latin American Feminist Movements.

Kirkwood formed and led the group known as Movimiento Feminista on August 11 and 12, 1983, during the Fourth National Day of Protest. This was a feminist coalition of 60 women who marched through downtown Santiago, Chile, and on the steps of the National Library. Protestors held signs that read “Democracia ahora. Movimiento Feminista Chile” (Democracy now. The Chilean Feminist Movement). The march was a response to the deaths of eighty-two people by soldiers during mass protests in Santiago. Kirkwood challenged the authoritarian regime while fighting against the patriarchal restrictions and violence it enacted on its women and its citizens.

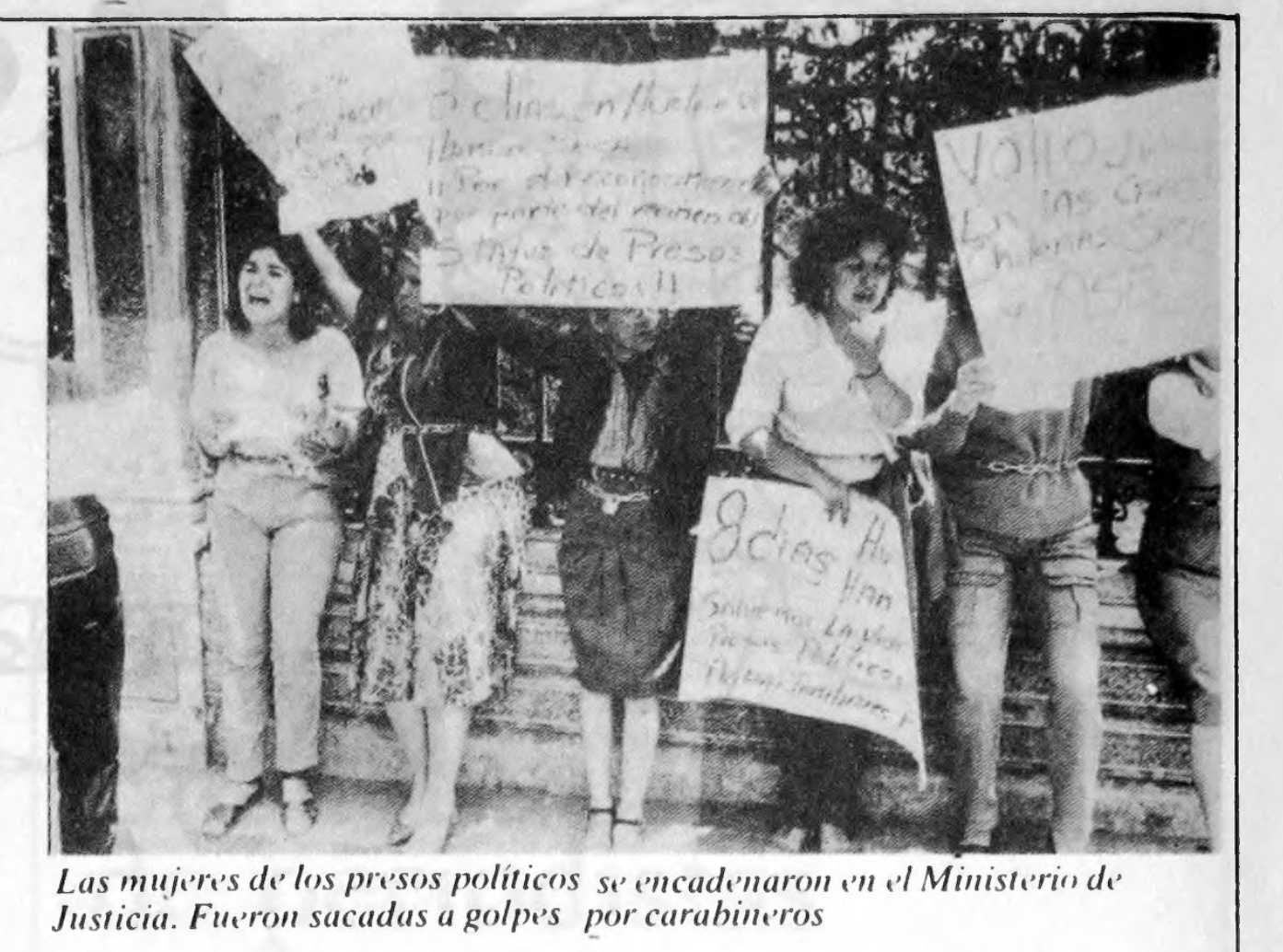
Clipping from the article “Mujeres por la vida” by Julieta Kirkwood, published in Cotidiano Mujer magazine in 1986 (Year 1, No. 10, p. 4). The caption states, “The wives of political prisoners chained themselves to the Ministry of Justice. They were dragged out by force by police officers.”

Kirkwood was also an early member of Mujeres por la Vida (Women for Life). The group was founded in 1983 and organized public demonstrations against Pinochet’s oppression. She helped plan and participate in street protests that reclaimed public spaces for women in politics and activism. She played a significant role in Mujeres Por la Vida’s International Women’s Day demonstration on 8 March 1984. It was the first major women’s protest after the coalition was formed, and organizers led over two hundred women to protest. They gathered in the Plaza de la Constitución, joining hands and singing the national anthem in front of La Moneda, a Chilean presidential palace, which was bombed during the coup d’etat. Police violently shut down the protest and arrested twenty women. Shortly after, ten additional people were arrested at the rally, including Julieta Kirkwood and other members of Mujeres Por la Vida. Members not detained organized immediately and publicly denounced repression and demanded democracy.

After the formation of Mujeres Por la Vida, Kirkwood also became an important figure in MEMCH (Movimiento Pro-Emancipación de la Mujer Chilena–1983). This was a coordinating feminist body that united 24 women's and human rights organizationsThey also organized demonstrations, especially during March, declared Women's Month by the organization. MEMCH-83 was the main organization linking the feminist demands of Chilean citizens and poor Chilean women to broader anti-authoritarian movements. MEMCH-83 revived the legacy of the original organization of the 1930s, formerly known as MEMCh. The original group combined women’s rights activism with labor and leftist politics before losing support during the postwar repression. The new emphasis of MEMCH-83 was on Chile's pro-democracy movement, in which Kirkwood contributed to its theoretical framework. Kirkwood’s feminist analysis, more specifically her critique of the divide between party politics and feminism, became widely used by MEMCH-83. It informed the organization’s approach to using feminist demands in the struggle against dictatorship.

== Literary work ==
Kirkwood’s writings during her lifetime appeared in FLACSO papers, feminist journals, and her books. She contributed to Análisis magazine, Isis International’s Women’s Magazine, the Boletín del Círculo de Estudios de la Mujer, and was involved in the production of Furia (1981–1984), a journal that debated feminism, socialism, and democracy under dictatorship. Her most influential book, Ser política en Chile: Las feministas y los partidos, was published posthumously in 1986, edited by Ana María Arteaga. The work critiqued both conservative and progressive women’s efforts for maintaining patriarchal structures, and argued that feminism was a tool of social liberation that included daily and domestic life. It is regarded as a foundational text of Chilean feminism. In the book, she argued that women’s oppression could not be explained solely through economic structures, since patriarchal domination also operated through the family and everyday life. She explores women's history of political action in Chile and highlights their political involvement in events like the Popular Unity project, their struggle for suffrage in Chile, and women's stance on the military dictatorship in 1973.

In 1987, after her death, Kirkwood's colleagues compiled Feminarios, a collection of her teaching materials, and Patricia Crispi edited Tejiendo rebeldías, which brought together her dispersed writings. These volumes were both published in 1987 to consolidate and share the theoretical and activist contributions of Kirkwood for larger networks of feminists. In 1990, Ser política en Chile was reissued with the subtitle Los Nudos de la Sabiduría Feminista (“The Knots of Feminist Wisdom”) edited by Riet Delsing. Kirkwood uses the concept of “knots" in her writing to convey the relationship between knowledge and power in feminist thought, reflecting the difficulty of producing feminist theory that both critiques existing structures and transforms political practice under authoritarianism. Since 2017, her writings have been republished due to a renewed interest in her work, though her books have not been translated in other languages.

== Theoretical contributions ==
Her theoretical work studied gender issues from a feminist point of view. She criticized the conservative feminist discourse while incorporating the Latin American culture from an interculturality perspective.

Together with Margarita Pisano at La Morada, Kirkwood coined the slogan “Democracy in the country, in the house, and in the bed,” which became a widely adopted rallying cry for feminist movements resisting Chile’s military regime. The slogan provided the ideological support for women’s social movements throughout Latin America, which linked the struggle against authoritarian regimes with the struggle against patriarchal power in domestic and intimate settings.

== Death and legacy ==
Julieta Kirkwood died on 8 April 1985 in Santiago after a battle with cancer. Her death occurred during a peak in women’s mobilization against the Pinochet regime, a movement she had helped shape through her political activism and her feminist scholarship. Through her work with the CEM and FLACSO Gender Studies Area, Kirkwood helped establish gender studies as an academic field in Chile. She linked feminist theory to empirical research on women’s labor, indigenous women, and rural gender relations. She is widely regarded as a foundational figure in the development of Chilean feminist thought.

== Publications ==
- Chile: la mujer en la formulación política (Santiago: FLACSO, 1981).
- Feminarios (Santiago: Documentas, 1987).
- El feminismo como negación del autoritarismo (Santiago: FLACSO, 1983).
- Feminismo y participación política en Chile (Santiago: FLACSO, 1982).
- Feministas y políticas (Santiago: FLACSO, 1984).
- Los nudos de la sabiduría feminista (Santiago: FLACSO, 1984).
- La política del feminismo en Chile (Santiago: FLACSO, 1983).
- Ser política en Chile: las feministas y los partidos (Santiago: LOM Ediciones, 1982, 1986 y 2010).
- Ser política en Chile: los nudos de la sabiduría feminista (Santiago: Cuarto Propio, 1990).
- Tejiendo rebeldías : escritos feministas de Julieta Kirkwood (Santiago: CEM, 1987).
