= Marta Vergara =

Chilean author, editor and journalist

- Unión Femenina de Chile, 1931
- Born: Marta Vergara Varas; 2 January 1898; Valparaíso, Chile
- Died: 1995 (aged 96–97); Santiago, Chile
- Occupations: journalist, writer, women's rights activist
- Years active: 1925–1976
- Notable work: Memorias de una mujer irreverente
- Spouse: Marcos Chamúdez Reitich

Marta Vergara Varas (2 January 1898 – 1995) was a Chilean author, editor, journalist and women's rights activist. Introduced to international feminism in 1930, she became instrumental in the development of the Inter-American Commission of Women (CIM) helping gather documentation on laws which affected women's nationality. She pushed Doris Stevens to broaden the scope of international feminism to include working women's issues in the quest for equality. A founding member of the Pro-Emancipation Movement of Chilean Women (Spanish: Movimiento Pro-Emancipación de las Mujeres de Chile (MEMCh)), she was editor of its monthly bulletin La Mujer Nueva ("The New Woman"). When she was ousted from the Communist Party she moved to Europe and worked as a journalist during the war. At war's end, she returned to Washington, D.C., and worked at the CIM continuing to press for women's suffrage and equality, before returning to Chile, where she resumed her writing career.

== Biography ==
Marta Vergara Varas was born on 2 January 1898 in Valparaíso, Chile to Clotilde Varas Valdovinos and Pedro Vergara Silva, the youngest of three sisters. Her early years were spent there on the coast, until the 1906 Valparaíso earthquake destroyed her family home and killed her mother. From that time forward, the family moved back and forth between the coast and the capital. By the late 1920s, Vergara was working as a journalist and in 1927 when Carlos Ibáñez del Campo began his leadership after the coup d'état, she fled to Europe. Working as a correspondent for El Mercurio she made contact with other journalists.

== Feminism ==
Doris Stevens was among those journalism contacts. Stevens introduced Vergara to the study that the Inter-American Commission of Women (Spanish: Comisión Interamericana de Mujeres) (CIM) was engaged in concerning women's nationality, recruiting her to become Chile's delegate for the Hague Codification Conference of the League of Nations in 1930. The following year, Vergara was appointed as an alternate presenter for the report to the League of Nations meeting in Geneva, Switzerland. After the conference, Vergara remained in Geneva lobbying for women's rights for several months. When she returned to Chile in 1932, she brought back an international view of feminism and found that the political unrest which had forced her departure had settled, with civil liberties being restored. In 1933, Vergara was supposed to represent Chile at the 1933 Pan-American Conference in Montevideo, Uruguay, Before the conference, she and Stevens had a split in philosophical ideas and Vergara withdrew. She believed that the U.S. vision was predominating the CIM and that working class women's needs were being omitted from the agenda. In a letter to Stevens, she spelled out that one could not address merely political and social aims without dealing with economic inequalities as well. Stevens went to the conference without Vergara's support and managed to secure passage the Convention on the Nationality of Women.The following year, Chilean women were granted the right to vote in municipal elections.

In 1935, Vergara joined with Elena Caffarena, Flora Heredia, Evangelina Matte, Graciela Mandujano, Aída Parada, Olga Poblete, María Ramírez, Eulogia Román, and Clara Williams de Yunge to found the Pro-Emancipation Movement of Chilean Women (MEMCh). The organization would become one of the most important feminist organizations in Chile and focused on addressing the socio-economic, cultural and legal limitations for women. Vergara became the editor of the monthly bulletin of the organization, La Mujer Nueva (The New Woman), which published articles on various women's issues and information on international meetings and conferences. In January, 1936, Vergara and MEMCh participated in the International Labour Organization meeting held in Santiago. Though she disagreed with Stevens that full maternity leave represented a violation of equality goals, Vergara agreed to represent the CIM at the conference. Stevens was uneasy about having a delegate support an issue she felt drew upon differences between men and women. But, she needed Vergara and MEMCh's support for the Equal Rights Treaty, which was facing strong opposition from the US State Department and was willing to compromise.

On 17 November 1936, Vergara married Marcos Chamúdez Reitich in Santiago, Chile. The following month, she participated in the CIM conference in Buenos Aires, Argentina. She and Stevens presented a plea for the Pan-American Union to recommend that all member states enfranchise women as a means of promoting world peace. Unlike Stevens and Alice Paul, Vergara's feminist ideas were influenced by her study of communism and were decidedly leftist. Rather than the idea that the individual was a "fundamental political unit", as the Americans' advocated, Vergara thought that the family was the ideal political unit and worked toward social solidarity through protecting family rights. Her husband, was a communist at that time, though he later rejected the communist party. Vergara joined the communist party after their marriage, yet she often disagreed with his politics. At the Buenos Aires conference, Vergara and Stevens each spoke in favor of the Equal Rights Treaty and for the first time Stevens agreed to back maternity leave. Though the women were able to pass a resolution in favor of the treaty, the larger Pan-American conference did not pass the legislation either in 1936 or in 1938 when Stevens was ousted from the CIM.

Vergara resigned from MEMCh in 1937, along with Caffarena, when it became apparent that the Communist members were trying to remake the organization to focus solely on the issues faced by working class women. Then in 1939 both she and Chamúdez were ousted from the communist party and moved to the United States. They took up residence briefly in New York City and spent time with their friend Pablo Neruda. During World War II, the couple lived in Europe, where she resumed her journalism career and Chamúdez, who had trained as a photographer during their time in New York, became a war photographer, trailing General Patton's troops. Vergara also spent time with her sister's family, who were living in Paris. When the war ended, Vergara returned to the U.S. and became a full-time worker for the CIM. She was responsible for the CIM's 1949 report which recommended all member states of the Organization of American States to commit to civil, economic and political equality for women. The report received support from the Ninth International Conference of American States in Bogotá and provided international leverage for Chilean women to attain full suffrage that same year.

The couple returned to Chile in 1951 and Chamúdez worked as a photo-journalist writing anti-communist articles. Vergara published her autobiography Memorias de una mujer irreverente (Memoirs of an irreverent woman) in 1962, which was awarded the Santiago Municipal Literature Award. She continued to write until she lost her sight and was confined to the Israelita Nursing Home. She died in Santiago in 1995.

== Selected works ==
- Vergara, Marta (1927). Circunstancias (in Spanish). Santiago de Chile: Sociedad Boletín Comercial Salas & Cia. OCLC 55367805.
- Vergara, Marta (February 1936). "Necesidad del control de los nacimientos: el problema del aborto y la mujer obrera". La Mujer Nueva (in Spanish). 1 (4). Santiago, Chile: Movimiento Pro-Emancipación de las Mujeres de Chile.
- Vergara, Marta (March 1936). "Mejor salario y menos hijos son los requisitos indispensables para emancipar a la mujer". La Mujer Nueva (in Spanish). 1 (5). Santiago, Chile: Movimiento Pro-Emancipación de las Mujeres de Chile.
- Vergara, Marta (November 1937). "¿Cuál es la situación de la mujer? Extracto del informe de Marta Vergara". La Mujer Nueva (in Spanish). 2 (18). Santiago, Chile: Movimiento Pro-Emancipación de las Mujeres de Chile.
- Vergara, Marta (1962). Memorias de una mujer irreverente (in Spanish). Santiago de Chile: Zig-Zag. ISBN 978-956-324-198-3.
- Vergara, Marta (1966). Los adioses del caballero amalgamado (in Spanish). Santiago, Chile: Ediciones Politíca-Economía-Cultura. OCLC 253607510.
- Vergara, Marta (19 April 1968). Me despido de otro caballero: ensayo [I say goodbye to another gentleman: essay] (audio recording) (in Spanish). Santiago, Chile: Biblioteca Nacional. OCLC 55317254.
- Vergara, Marta (28 March 1976). "Aprender a escribir por causas honorables y otras no tanto". El Cronista Santiago (in Spanish). Santiago, Chile.
