= María Teresa del Canto =

Chilean teacher and politician

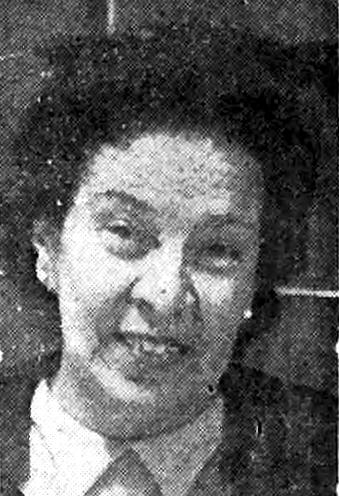
- María Teresa del Canto

Mayor of Santiago
- In office 19 June 1953 – 31 October 1957
- Preceded by: Mamerto Figueroa Parot
- Succeeded by: Fernando Gorroño Véliz

Minister of Education
- In office 3 November 1952 – 1 April 1953
- President: Carlos Ibáñez del Campo
- Preceded by: Luis Cruz Ocampo
- Succeeded by: Juan Gómez Millas

Personal details
- Born: María Teresa del Canto Molina; 18 January 1898 Catemu, Chile
- Died: 14 May 1987 (aged 89)
- Party: Women's Party
- Occupation: Teacher, politician

María Teresa del Canto Molina (18 January 1898 – 14 May 1987) was a Chilean teacher and politician. She was the country's second woman to become a minister of state, after Adriana Olguín. She also served as mayor of Santiago from 1953 to 1957.

== Biography ==
Del Canto was born in Catemu on 18 January 1898. She began her education in San Felipe, attending a boys' school, as there were no girls' schools in the city at the time. After obtaining the title of English Teacher from the Pedagogical School of Santiago, she worked in that capacity in San Felipe, San Carlos, and Rengo, retiring in 1950.

She was a member of the Women's Party of Chile, and was its national director of social affairs.

On 3 November 1952, she took office as Minister of Education in the second government of Carlos Ibáñez del Campo, after the position was turned down by fellow Women's Party member María de la Cruz. She was succeeded as minister by Juan Gómez Millas on 1 April 1953.

She was then appointed mayor of Santiago by President Ibáñez, a position she held from 19 June 1953 to 31 October 1957. In 1958 she became Superintendent of Education in the government of Jorge Alessandri.

In 1954, María Teresa del Canto was awarded a medal by the mayor of Paris, and the Pro Ecclesia et Pontifice by The Holy See. She also received honors from the cities of Madrid, Rio de Janeiro, and Asunción. She was awarded the Order of Merit of the World Board of Education in 1987, shortly before her death. She was also named an Illustrious and Meritorious Daughter of Catemu. In 1993 a school in her hometown was named in her honor.

María Teresa del Canto died on 14 May 1987 at age 89.
