= Women's suffrage in Chile =

Women's suffrage in Chile was introduced for municipal elections in 1935, national elections in 1949, and the 1952 presidential election. It was the product of a long period of activism, tracing back to 1877, when women were allowed to attend university, a reform which stimulated the formation of a women's movement. The women's suffrage was a reform which was actively promoted since the 1920s by the organizations Consejo Nacional de Mujeres de Chile Comité Nacional pro Derechos de la Mujer, Pro-Emancipation Movement of Chilean Women and Federación Chilena de Instituciones Femeninas (FECHIF).

== Beginning ==
The Decreto Amunátegui of November 6, 1877 is considered a starting point, as it enabled women to undertake university studies. Pioneering professionals emerged gradually in different areas, conceptualizing the inferiority women found themselves in.

They began to form and lead feminist organizations seeking social, political and civil vindication of women.

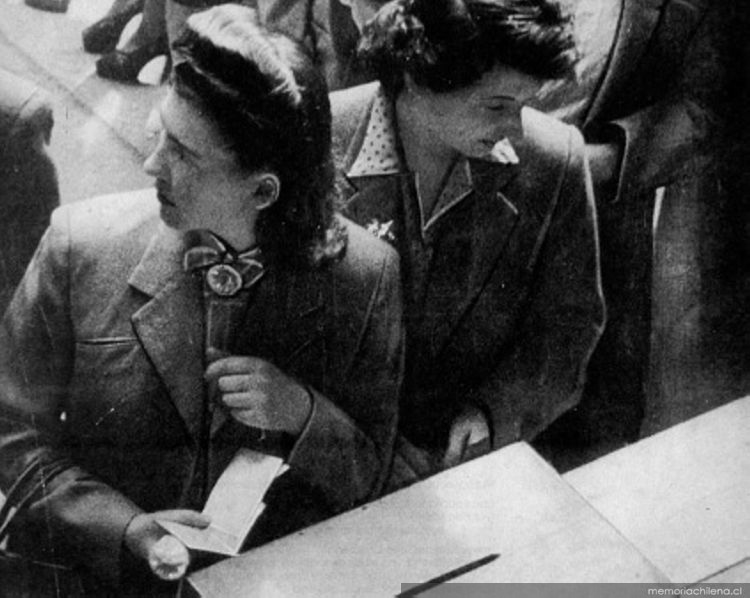
Chilean women voting in municipal elections in 1945.

== First attempts at electoral registration ==
In 1875 San Felipe, the first formal attempt to participate in popular elections was made by a group of women. They concurred to put their names on the electoral registers, with the argument that the law did not indicate voter sex.

It was the San Felipe Registration Board that decided to register Domitila Silva y Lepe by majority vote. The citizen was a widow of a former governor of the same province. She fulfilled the requirements imposed by the electoral law of 1874: to be Chilean and to know how to read and write.

Erika Maza, the author of "Catholicism, Anticlericalism and the Expansion of Women's Suffrage in Chile," points out that due this Registration Board’s reasoning, more women registered in other areas of the country. This is also expressed in works by Teresa Pereira and Germán Urzúa Valenzuela.

Evidence of women's desire to participate generated considerable debate within the political class, and was widely reflected in the press of the time. However, women were ultimately not permitted to exercise this right in the Elections Law of 1884.

== Prohibition of female suffrage by the Electoral Law of 1884 ==
As previously mentioned, the January 9, 1884 Article 40 No. 8 of the Elections Law specified that women cannot register to vote, despite meeting the requirements stipulated in Article 39:

=== ART. 39 ===
The board should enroll natural or legal Chileans in the voter registry who request registration and meet the following requirements:

1. Be twenty-five years of age if they are single, or twenty-one if they are married;

2. Know how to read and write;

3. Live in the respective sub-delegation.

It is presumed by right that he who knows how to read and write has the income required by law

=== ART. 40 ===
The following groups will not be registered, even when they meet requirements listed in the previous article:

1. ° Those who, due to physical or moral impossibility, do not have the free use of their reason;

2. Those who are in the condition of indentured servitude;

3. Those who, at the time, are being processed for a crime or offense that deserves an afflictive penalty. Additionally, those who have been sentenced to penalties of this kind, unless they have obtained rehabilitation;

4. Those who have been convicted of fraudulent bankruptcy and have not been rehabilitated;

5. ° Those who have accepted jobs or distinctions from foreign governments without special permission from Congress, unless they have obtained rehabilitation from the Senate;

6. ° Individuals enrolled in the rural police, or who perform any paid service in it;

7. ° The classes and soldiers of the permanent army, navy and police forces;

8. ° Women; and

9. The regular ecclesiastics.

== Law No. 5357 ==
On January 15, 1934, President Arturo Alessandri Palma promulgated Law No. 5357, allowing women to participate in municipal elections:

=== Art. 19. ===
The following groups have the right to register in the Municipal Registry:

a) Women of Chilean nationality, over 21 years of age, who know how to read and write and reside in the corresponding commune; and

b) Foreigners; men and women over 21 years of age, with more than five consecutive years of residence in the country, who know how to read and write and reside in the corresponding commune.

The same law allows women to be candidates:

=== Art. 56. ===
In order to be elected to the Council it is required that one:

a) Be Chilean;

b) Meet the requirements to register in Municipal Electoral Registries;

c) Have residence in the commune for more than one year;

Women may also be elected.

The first municipal election in which women participated was that of 1935. In this first municipal election, 76,049 of the 850,000 potential voters registered. 98 candidates presented themselves and held 2% of the positions. Herminia Aburto Colihueque was the first Mapuche woman to run for public office, although was not elected.

== First proposal of a universal suffrage law ==
In 1941, the Movement for the Emancipation of Women in Chile (MEMCH) proposed a Universal Suffrage Bill. It was drafted by Elena Caffarena (as a jurist) and Flor Heredia (a law student), relying on the support of President Pedro Aguirre Cerda. The proposal was sent to Congress, but never came to be enacted due to the untimely death of the President. This event stalled the bill.

== FECHIF proposal ==
The project regained strength in 1944, the year in which the First National Congress of Women was held in Santiago and gave rise to the Chilean Federation of Women's Institutions (FECHIF): a body dedicated to organizing demands against any discrimination towards women, who then represented 51% of the potential electorate.

Strategies to obtain the right to vote focused on applying pressure to members of parliament through the articulate force achieved between the different women's organizations—which were convinced that they had the necessary arguments to obtain political rights.

In 1946, FECHIF was forcefully weakened by the radical Gabriel González Videla’s arrival to the presidency. Tension caused by the Cold War and the new president’s anti-communist position produced a great breakup in FECHIF. This happened when the Radical party delegates voted, without an absolute majority and without MEMCH’s presence, for the expulsion of the Communist Party supporters. Without the communists present in the Federation, MEMCH decided to withdraw by denouncing the arbitrary expulsion of the supporters.

Because of this, the FECHIF bill is not the original bill proposed by MEMCH.

== Law No. 9292 ==
On January 8, 1949, President Gabriel González Videla passed Law No. 9292, allowing women to participate in presidential and parliamentary elections, and separating the Registry into the Electoral Registry of Men and the Electoral Registry of Women:

=== Art. 1 ===
Subsection 9. In article 14, the following shall be added as the second subparagraph:

"The Electoral Registry, intended for the elections of President of the Republic and of Senators and Deputies, will be divided into the "Electoral Registry of Men" and the "Electoral Registry of Women." These registries, supplemented with the "Municipal Registry of Foreigners " will serve for the municipal elections."

Within ninety days following the enactment of the law, the Director of the Electoral Registry deleted the registry of those disabled, of both sexes, by Law No. 8987, known as the Damned Law :

=== Art. 3. ===
Beginning January 1, 1946, the Municipal Registry of Women and Foreigners formed during the extraordinary electoral registration period will have the value of the "Electoral Registry of Women," created by this law. For this purpose, within 90 days following the effective date of this law, the Electoral Registry Director will proceed to eliminate foreigners, men and women from the Municipal Registry, canceling their respective registrations, and will communicate these cancellations to the corresponding Real Estate Conservators. In turn, they can make the same eliminations in the copies of the Municipal Registry under their domain. At the same time, publication of the list of canceled registrations will be ordered in a newspaper of the capital and in a newspaper or newspaper of the head of the corresponding department. These cancellations will be communicated, by office, to each of the persons eliminated from the Municipal Registry. Once all these eliminations have been completed, the said Municipal Registry will be entitled "Electoral Registry of Women".

Unlike the other articles, modifications for the women's right to vote apply one hundred and twenty days after its proclamation:

=== Final article ===
This law shall take effect from its publication date in the Official Gazette, except in relation to the exercise of political vote by women, which shall govern one hundred and twenty days after said publication.

== Controversy over the electoral registers' cancellation ==
Communist Party members were erased from the electoral register, as well as persons suspected of participating in said organization by the Law for the Permanent Defense of Democracy, better known as the Damned Law.

Elena Caffarena, a leading figure in women's vindication, was not invited to the ceremony held for the celebration of the Female Suffrage Law. Three days after the event, the government suspended her civil rights. She was accused of being a communist and instigating rebellion. It was an arbitrary act since she never joined a party, although her sympathy was directed to the left.

During those days, the lawyer decided to put all her knowledge at the service of those being persecuted by that law, which would be repealed in 1958 in the context of presidential elections.
