= Mamerto Figueroa =

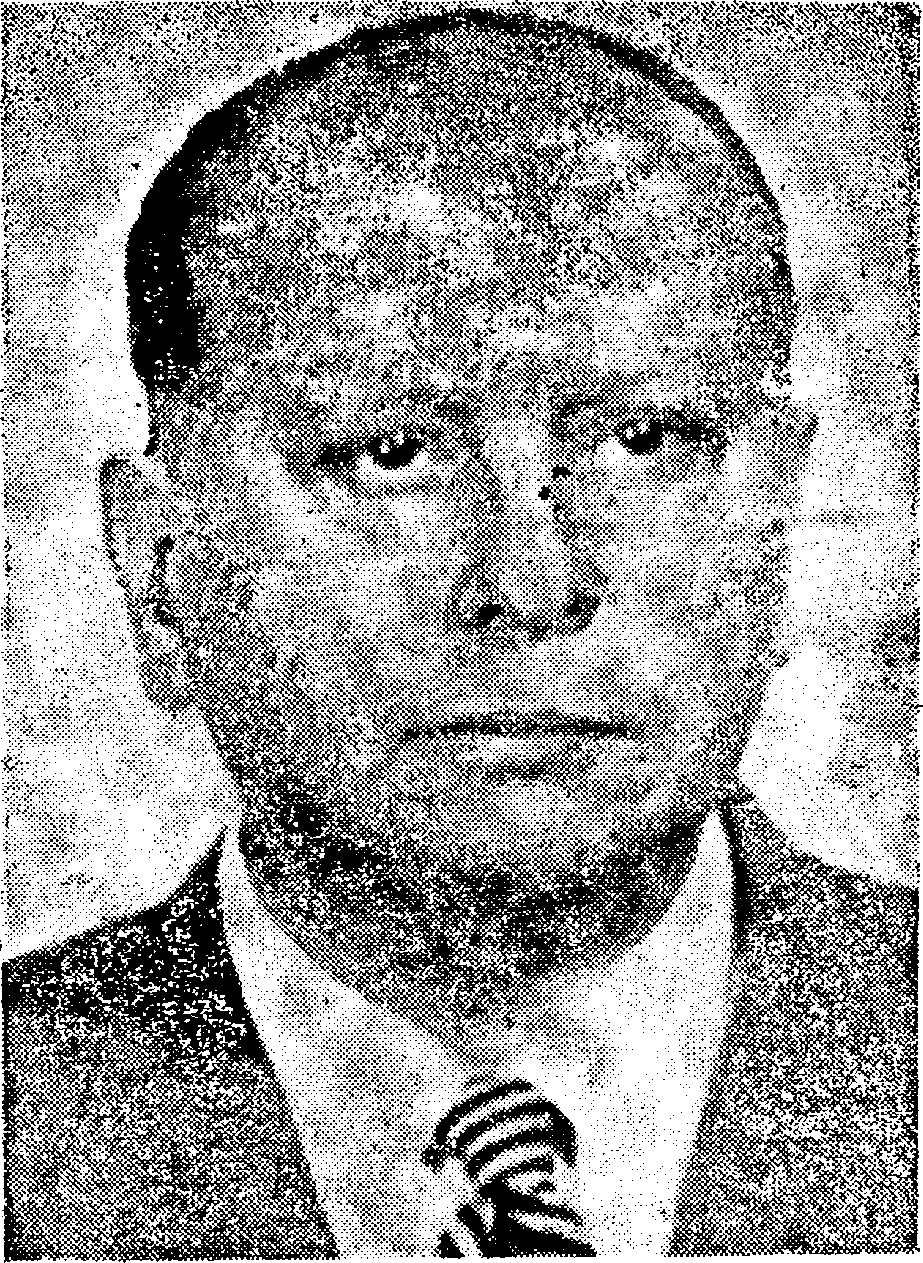
- Born: Mamerto Domingo Figueroa Parot; August 4, 1900; Santiago, Chile
- Died: June 2, 1974 (aged 73); Santiago, Chile
- Title: Mayor of Santiago
- Predecessor: Renato Valdés Alfonso
- Successor: María Teresa del Canto Molina
- Parent(s): Guillermo Figueroa Molina (father); María Isabel Parot Silva (mother)

Mamerto Domingo Figueroa Parot (August 4, 1900 - June 2, 1974) was a Chilean independent politician, equestrian, and member of the National Independent Movement, and later the Ibañist National Alliance of Workers, while working as Mayor of Santiago in 1953. Additionally, he created the Confederation of Popular Collectives (CONCOPO).

== Biography ==
He was born to parents Guillermo Figueroa Molina (1867-unknown) and María Isabel Parot Silva (1865-1946), of Spanish-French descent. His paternal grandfather Mamerto Figueroa Valdivia (1838-1904) was a lawyer and Minister of the Valparaíso Court of Appeals. His brother, Guillermo Figueroa Parot (1893-1967) was a banker and General Manager of the Emergency Housing Foundation. He was the uncle of Gonzalo Piwonka Figueroa(1931-2011), a Chilean historian.

=== Political career ===
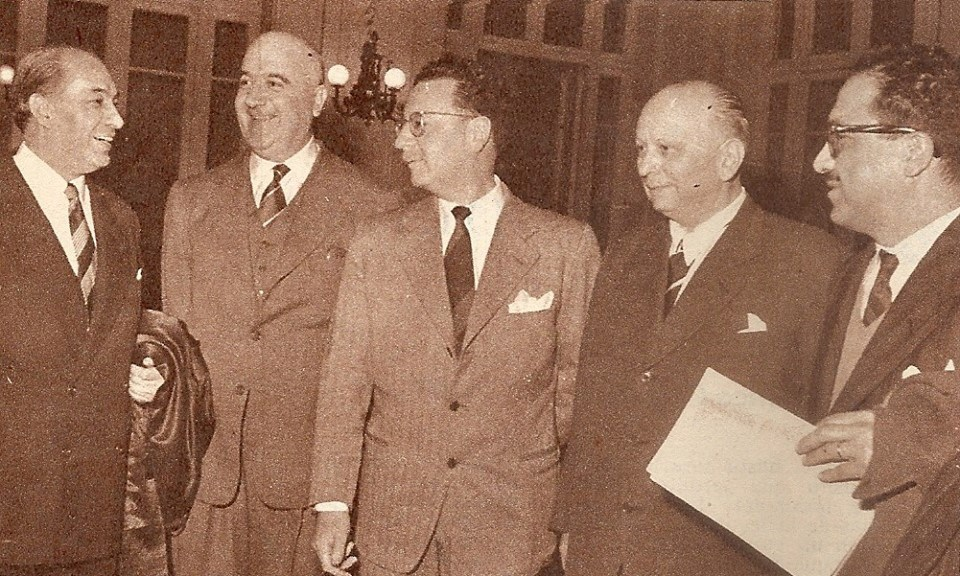
FRAP Presidential Convention Organizing Committee. Salvador Allende Gossens can be seen in the middle of the image; to his left is Mamerto Figueroa Parot.

In his youth, he was a leader of the Liberal Youth. One of his first political activities was in 1931, when he took part in the fifth assembly of the Liberal Party. During 1952, he was head of the propaganda department in the campaign of presidential candidate Carlos Ibáñez del Campo, who won the elections of that year; He was chosen for the position by Arturo Olavarría Bravo, who served as Chile's Minister of the Interior under the presidency of Pedro Aguirre Cerda. He served as Intendant and Mayor of Santiago in 1953, holding those positions from February 20 to June 19, 1953, under the government of then-President Carlos Ibáñez. He resigned from that position after a violent outburst against then deputy Ernesto Araneda Rocha.

Later that year, he was a pre-candidate for the parliamentary election of the 4th provincial grouping of Santiago, but lost this election to Luis Quintero, of the Socialist Party. In June 1954, he directed the Radio “Aurora de Chile”, successor to Radio “El Mercurio”. In 1957, he was a pre-candidate for the Popular Action Front, but the candidacy was finally ceded to Salvador Allende, who would become president of Chile 13 years later. He died in Recoleta, Santiago, on June 2, 1974, at the age of 73.

== Electoral history ==
=== 1953 parliamentary elections ===
- Parliamentary election of the 4th Provincial Group of Santiago, 1953

Candidate	Party	Votes	%	Result
Luis Quinteros Tricot	Socialist	102,760	48.70	Elected
Mamerto Figueroa Parot	Ind.	64,613	30.62	
Pedro Foncea Aedo	Agrarian-Labor	25,929	12.28	
María de la Cruz Toledo	Women's	14,834	7.03	
Jorge Berguño Meneses	Ind.	2,854	1.35	
Total		153,941		
