= Celinda Arregui =

Chilean feminist politician, writer, teacher

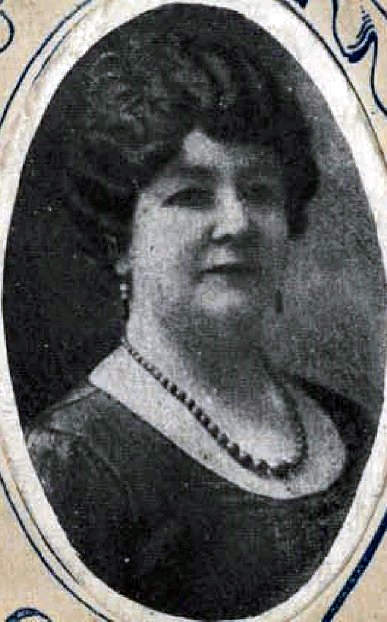
Celinda Arregui (1921)

Celinda Arregui de Rodicio (née Arregui Quezada; July 25, 1864 – April 1941) was a Chilean feminist politician, writer, teacher and suffrage activist best known for her work in favor of the rights of women in the political, social and civil spheres in Chile.

== Early life ==
Celinda Adela Arregui Quezada was born in Santiago, July 25, 1864. She was the daughter of Balbino Arregui and Isabel Quezada.

During the Chilean Civil War of 1891, she participated as a spy using the telegraph in Quillota for the Revolutionary Committee in favor of the National Congress of Chile.

On September 26, 1903, she married the Spaniard Pegerto Rodicio Pérez.

== Career ==
In 1919, together with Eloísa Díaz, Beatriz Letelier, Hayra Guerrero de Sommerville, Isaura Dinator, Juana de Aguirre Cerda, Carmela de Laso, and Fresia Escobar, among others, she founded the National Council of Women of Chile "which actively participated in the defense of women's rights".

In 1926, she was one of the founders of the Partido Demócrata Femenino (Women's Democratic Party) along with Rebeca Varas, E. Brady, and Gabriela Barros, among others; they drafted one of the first bills that sought to amend electoral legislation giving women the right to vote.

In 1927, she founded the "Bando Femenino", an institution that brought together several feminist women's groups and whose objective was to join forces in favor of the movement for women's rights in the late 1920s.

She also organized the Congreso Interamericano de Mujeres (Inter-American Congress of Women) held in Santiago in 1929.

== Selected works ==
- Manual de telegrafía eléctrica, teórico práctico: con los últimos adelantos sobre la telegrafía sin hilos para los estudiantes del ramo (Valparaíso: Impr. Gillet, 1901).
- La telegrafia sin hilos: sistema Marconi y Telefunken prácticamente al alcance de todos (Santiago: Editorial Zig-Zag, 1916).
- Los niños vagabundos y la criminalidad infantil (1918).
- Laborando (Santiago: Impr. Cervantes, 1921).
