= Ernestina Pérez Barahona =

Chilean physician and feminist activist

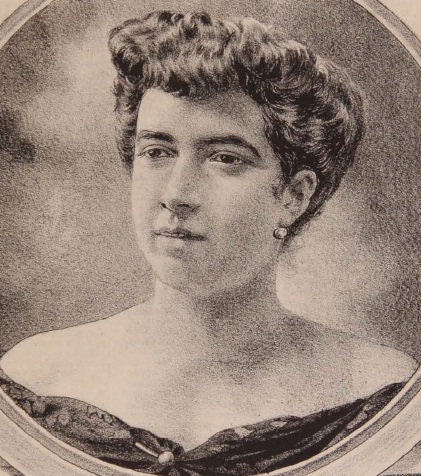
Ernestina Pérez Barahona

Ernestina Pérez Barahona (8 August 1865, Valparaíso, Chile – 1951) was a Chilean physician and feminist activist known for being one of the first female students of medicine at the University of Chile and for being the second woman physician in Latin America, graduating just days after Eloísa Díaz.

== Education ==
Pérez Barahona received her secondary education at the Lebrun Pinochet School. She received a Bachelor of Letters degree in 1883 and began her study of medicine later in the same year. In January 1887, she received her Physician and Surgeon degree and title. She left for Berlin in 1888, entering the Frederick Wilhelm University (now known as Humboldt University of Berlin). She took classes alongside men, but administrators installed a screen to prevent the other students from seeing her. She was the first woman to study medicine at the University. Two years later, she went to Paris to continue her studies.

== Career ==
Pérez Barahona returned to Chile in 1894. She practiced medicine at San Borja Hospital and taught classes for female students at the request of President José Manuel Balmaceda. She made another trip to Europe in 1910, publishing her book Compendio de Ginecologia in Leipzig in 1910. While in Germany, the Medical Academy of Berlin appointed her as an honorary member. She was the first person from South America to become a member.

Throughout her career, she was particularly interested in women's health and personal hygiene and advocated for women's education. She was part of a lecture circle, women's club, and the Chilean Red Cross, and founded an association for university women. Related to her interest in public health and hygiene, she was concerned about alcoholism and how it would affect Chileans.

Many years after her death, the Chilean Women's Union (La Unión Chilena De Mujeres) convened a special meeting in her honor, including a speech by Elena Caffarena. They honored her for opening up the field of medicine for women in South America and her feminist advocacy.
