= Marcos Chamúdez =

Chilean journalist (1907–1989)

Marcos Chamúdez Reitich, also known as Marcos Chamudes (16 January 1907 – 25 June 1989) was a Chilean politician, photographer and journalist.

== Family background ==
Marcos Chamúdez Reitich was born in Santiago on January 16, 1907, into a family of Sephardic Jews, son of Oscar Chamúdez and María Reitich, who arrived in Moisesville (the first Argentine colony of Russian Jewish immigrants) before settling in Chile. He studied at the National Institute and at the Barros Arana National Board (INBA).

== Political career ==
Chamúdez excelled as a youth leader and in 1929 joined the Communist Party of Chile (CPC). Subsequently, he devoted himself to journalism and founded the newspaper Frente Popular and the magazine Qué Hayo. He participated in the beginnings of the Communist Party of Peru and played a part in the Communist Party of Chile, being elected Member of Parliament for the Sixth Provincial Grouping of Valparaiso and Quillota for the period 1937–1941 in the 1937 parliamentary elections. He was a delegate in the Permanent Commission of Interior Government, in Constitution, Legislation and Justice, and in Labour and Social Legislation and a member of the Permanent Commission of Public Education. In the Chamber of Deputies he participated in passing laws authorising a loan of up to $25,000,000 in bonds to the national airline, LAN, a fiscal guarantee for purchase of equipment and radio-communications stations. In August 1937 with deputy Ricardo Latcham (socialist) and in June 1938 in the Senate he denounced illegal payments in exchange for immigration authorizations, which nevertheless continued with the discovery in 1939, that officials of the chancellery had sold Jews entry visas to Chile, in direct contravention of the law and consular rules.

For the government of Pedro Aguirre Cerda, the Popular Front candidate for a coalition of Radicals, Socialists and Communists, the year 1938 brought fundamental change in the political history of Chile with the conservative government structure being replaced by one more progressive, though major cultural conflicts crossed economic, anthropological and sociological spheres. In this context Chamudes was expelled from the Communist Party on 29 September 1940 for unknown reasons, though he was accused of being a traitor in an article in the newspaper El Siglo on September 30, 1940. As a result of the expulsion, Chamudes chose to leave the country. His emigration to the United States of America signalled his change of sides for many Chilean communists; he became a staunch opponent of communism.

== Photographer ==
Chamúdez' activity as a photographer spans the decades of the 1940s and 50s. On November 14, 1941, Chamúdez moved to the United States with his wife Marta Vergara Varas, a prominent journalist and activist for women's rights with whose communist views he did not always agree, though their marriage remained strong. There he began his photographic activity, studying at the private School of Modern Photography, New York City, in portraiture, commercial and colour photography, then dedicating himself to a career as a photographer.

During World War II Chamúdez volunteered for the US Army and was accepted as a war correspondent. He photographed on the European front where his best-known stories covered the release of prisoners from concentration camps and US military activity in Germany under the command of General George Patton. He was decorated and subsequently was made a United States citizen, but had to renounce his Chilean citizenship.

After the end of the war, Chamúdez settled in Washington D.C. for eight months to work as a freelance photographer and received commissions from Marcial Mora, Chilean ambassador in the United States, in particular a portrait of Gabriela Mistral at the White House, after she had won the Nobel Prize in Literature (1945). In 1946 his photographs of Latin American personalities taken in New York were exhibited in the Hall of Delegates of the Pan American Union (OAS) including portraits of the Peruvian painter José Sabogal and that of the Chilean writer Benjamín Subercaseaux.

His activity as a war photographer continued in 1947 as a reporter for the United Nations when he traveled to Europe as an official photojournalist for the Balkan Commission of Inquiry. These pictures were carried by the New York Herald Tribune and La Nación de Chile, while US Camera dedicated a space to them in its 1948 Yearbook. and a set was exhibited in 1947 in the Delegate Room of the United Nations, as an annex to the debate on the report of the Balkan Commission of Investigation in the Security Council. He also covered unrest in Greece, Yugoslavia and Bulgaria.

From 1946 to 1949 he worked at the International Refugee Organization. During this period, while covering events in different parts of the world, he also made portraits of important artists and writers including Pablo Picasso whom he portrayed in a cubist manner in pictures taken during the opening of an exhibition of ceramics by the artist in Paris in 1949, and displayed in Chamudes' first exhibition, in the Sala del Pacifico, Santiago in 1951 along with portraits of Jorge Amado, Paul Éluard, Joan Miró, Pablo Neruda, Gabriela Mistral, Rufino Tamayo, Jorge Amado, Irene Curie and Julian Huxley. A contemporary review in the journal Pro arte 'Trasfondo en las fotos de Chamudes' by painter Víctor Carvacho (1916–1996) praised the artistic quality of the exhibition, and another, by Austrian-born fellow Chilean photographer Ignacio Hochhaüsler (1892-1983), emphasised its humanist content;

Seldom has a photographer impressed me as much as Marco Chamudes. With a firm pulse, confident eyes and a big heart, he has captured fleeting moments of life, which cause emotion and stir up the conscience. He has gone through the countries of the world with his camera, without bringing us spring scenery, light effects, trees in bloom, or romantic retreats. He teaches us nostalgia, desolation, human suffering and weakness and also, some hope and optimism.

A little about the exhibition; A piece of bread: a Greek woman holds a piece of bread in her hand and asks for more; a little girl next to her with a hungry face and full of envy. That photo oppresses the heart. In the next, we see a group of priests, apparently happy. A widow sitting in a passage reflects despair. Sunday in Warsaw; carefree people move through a square with ruins of feudal mansions. Paris: Existentialism: an idyll of today, Flea Market: a still life with humorous originality. New York: A very dynamic Harlem; a painter paints "Bohemia in Greenwich Village" on the public pavement. Like a relic of the last century, an elderly couple walks through the colonial suburbs, elegantly dressed. Two Austrian Jews, thin and weak, wander aimlessly after years of concentration camp. In front of the Cathedral of Bamberg, two women who have seen better times, chatter animatedly. Displaced: A group of sorrowful photos for which there are no words to describe such misery; children crying, old women holding out their hands, a woman searching unsuccessfully for her granddaughter. Beings without hope or future. The Oktoberfest in Münich, with its overflowing joy, serves as a counterpoint. Imposing vistas of the Acropolis of Athens. Millenarian temples of white marble, cut out from the immense and deep sky. (Caption for accompanying photograph: Ruins of the Acropolis, another sample of true interest that is exhibited in the photo exhibition of Marcos Chamudea in the Sala del Pacifico). A portrait of Pablo Picasso, of giant size, elicits admiration.

Pablo Neruda, looking over a balcony, then in another photograph, browsing at the bouquinistes along the Seine, and in another, buying snails for his famous collation. Rome in the holy year is captured with originality. Toscanini del Tránsito shows a policeman masterfully directing street traffic with elegant gestures worthy of an orchestra conductor. Shots of Eisenhower and Tito. Among the portraits which stand out are those of Claudio Arrau, Ilya Ehrenburg, Gonzalez Vera, Santiago Labarca, Arturo Matte, Marcial Mora and other important personalities. By capturing the faces of beautiful Chilean ladies, he reveals a talent for psychology.

The work of Marcus Chamudes is the result of tireless effort, great enthusiasm and enormous human feeling. His photographs are well composed, treated with patience, making a rich and detailed repertoire devoid of cheap effects. His imagery is never unsightly nor in bad taste or crude. Chamudes plans to travel through Chile. We hope for no results of the extremes of those appreciated in this exhibition.

== Journalist in Chile ==
Chamúdez returned to Chile in 1951, where he served as a photojournalist for the Economic and Social Council and as the official photographer for President Gabriel González Videla, while also setting up his own studio and gallery. He regained his Chilean citizenship through an act of parliament. As a columnist and radio broadcaster he produced the news program Beware, do not deny me! on Radio Agriculture, until in 1954 he moved to Radio Cooperativa Vitalicia with the program Marcos Chamudes reports and comments. For Magnum in 1952 he travelled travel to Bolivia to cover the National Revolutionary Movement. From this work, one of his images, an heroic Portrait of a Bolivian Miner was selected by Edward Steichen and exhibited at the Museum of Modern Art in New York (MoMA) in the 1955 exhibition The Family of Man which went on to tour the world and was seen by an audience of 9 million.

From 1956 Chamúdez was a correspondent of the magazine Visión in Buenos Aires, reporting from Argentina, Uruguay and with visits to Bolivia and Paraguay. Turning from photography to dedicate himself to journalism, on May 1, 1959, Chamúdez was appointed director of the newspaper La Nacion until 1961, when he edited the southern edition of the magazine Visión. In 1963, he founded and directed the weekly Politica, Cultura e Economia (PEC), the main anticommunist platform of the time.

== Later life ==
Chamúdez encountered opposition from the CCP which accused him of being a traitor, and in response, in 1964, he published his autobiography entitled El libro blanco de mi leyenda negra ('The white book of my black legend').

After the victory of Salvador Allende in the elections of 1970 he emigrated to Buenos Aires where he lived until 1973.

He died on June 25, 1989, and was cremated in a sparsely attended funeral.

== Legacy ==
Most of his photographs are in the archive of the National Historical Museum of Chile, Plaza de Armas 951, Santiago, Chile while the rest are in the collection of writer Luis Rivano.
