= Aurora Argomedo =

Chilean politician, feminist and activist

Aurora Argomedo (died 1948 in (Viña del Mar) was a Chilean politician, feminist and activist, best known for her work for women's rights in Chile. She participated actively in the educational reforms of the 1910s and 1920s.

== Biography ==
Records at the University of Chile showed that Argomedo was gymnastics teacher.

== Activism ==
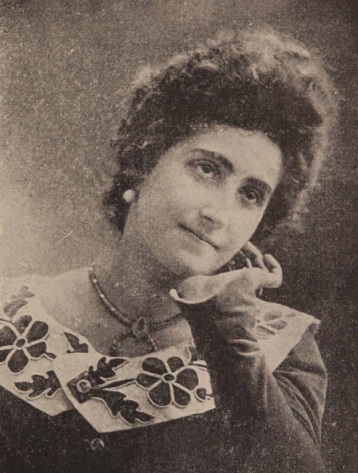
Argomedo was a supporter of the feminist Delia Ducoing de Arrate.

Politically, she was a founder of the Unión Femenina de Chile (Women's Union of Chile) with Gabriela Mandujano on 26 October 1927. Like the Bando Feminino, this organization also promoted equal rights for women in Chile with a focus on empowering women in navigating the archaic social divisions in the country. By 1932, this organization had over 1,000 members, providing cultural and social welfare projects, free medical care, and self-improvement courses. Initially, Argomedo and Mandujano favored apolitical activities such as education by creating a consciousness of needs among Chilean women living in urban areas. In 1934, the organization actively supported the civil and political rights of women, particularly women's suffrage. Argomedo also supported other feminists such as the writer Delia Ducoing (also known as Isabel Morel), who published the book Charlas femininas ("Women's talks") and the feminist magazine Nosotras.
