= Herminia Aburto Colihueque =

Mapuche activist (1910–1992)

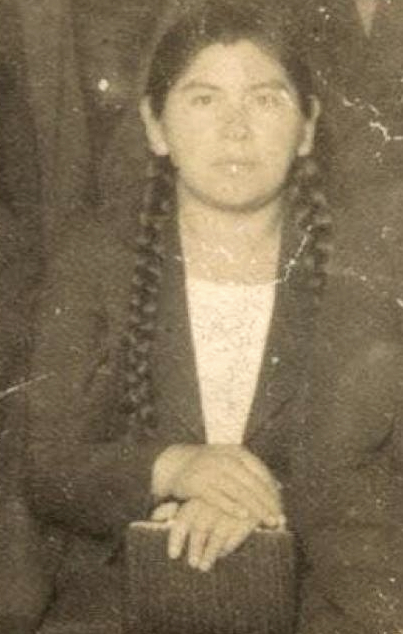
Herminia Aburto Colihueque in the 1940s

Herminia Aburto Colihueque (1910–1992) was a Mapuche activist from Chile. She was the first woman from the Mapuche people to run for public office in an election in Chile. She was also president of the Araucanian Women's Society Yafluayin and secretary of the Araucanian Federation.

== Early life ==
She was born in Collimalliñ, Chile, in 1910, the daughter of Manuel Aburto Panguilef, founder and president of the Araucanian Federation between 1922 and 1940, and Abelina Colihueque Lemunao, both members of the Mapuche people.

Unlike many Mapuche women and those from lower classes, Herminia was able to access education, learning to read and write. This allowed her to become an editor for the Araucanian Federation's documentary production, excelling in her role as she was responsible for drafting documentation related to the Mapuche's claims to their usurped lands.

== Political career ==
In 1935, Herminia Aburto Colihueque ran as an independent candidate for councillor of Temuco in that year's municipal elections, which were the first in which women exercised their right to vote in the country. However, Herminia was not elected, but became the first Mapuche woman to run for public office in Chile. From that year onwards, there was growing political participation by the Mapuche people.

In 1938, she became president of the Araucanian Women's Society Yafluayin, one of the first Mapuche women's associations, which was created in 1937. In April 1939, this organisation participated in the Araucanian National Congress. That same year, she was part of the Mapuche delegation—along with Chepo Antimán, Colilla Marilla, and Marihuán Rapimán—that met with the Pro-Emancipation Movement of Women of Chile (MEMCH). From the 1940s onwards, Herminia settled in the city of Valparaíso and later in Santiago de Chile.

She died in 1992 in Gorbea, Chile.
