= Eloísa Díaz =

Chilean physician (1866–1950)

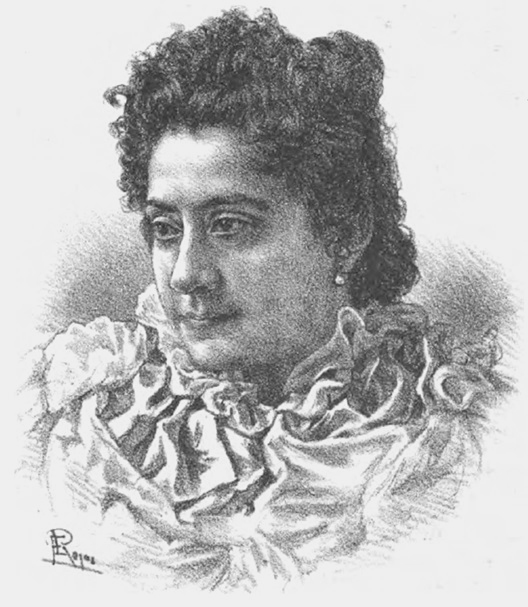
- Diaz illustrated by Luis Fernando Rojas, 1897
- Born: Eloísa Díaz Inzunza; 25 June 1866; Santiago, Chile
- Died: 1 November 1950 (aged 84); Santiago, Chile
- Education: University of Chile
- Years active: 1887–1925
- Known for: First female physician in South America
- Medical career
- Profession: Physician
- Sub-specialties: Gynaecology

Eloísa Díaz Inzunza (Spanish pronunciation: [elo.ˈisa ˈði.aθ]; 25 June 1866 – 1 November 1950) was a Chilean medical doctor. She was the first female medical student to attend the University of Chile, and the first woman to become a doctor of medicine in South America.

== Early life ==
Eloísa Díaz Insunza was born in Santiago, Chile. Her parents were Eulogio Díaz Varas and Carmela Insunza. She completed her requisite studies at Dolores Cabrera Martínez's school, Isabel Le Brun de Pinochet's school and at Instituto Nacional.

Díaz enrolled in 1880 in Escuela de Medicina de la Universidad de Chile (English: University of Chile, School of Medicine) shortly after a law was enacted which allowed women to study at the university. Díaz became the first woman in South America to graduate and earn her medical license She graduated on 27 December 1886, and obtained her degree on 3 January 1887. Her thesis was named Breves observaciones sobre la aparición de la pubertad en la mujer chilena y las predisposiciones patológicas del sexo (English: Brief observations on the apparition of puberty in Chilean women and their pathological predispositions about sex).

== Career ==
Díaz began working at San Borja Hospital in January 1891. She worked as a teacher and physician in Escuela Normal from 1889 until 1897. Díaz became the School Medic Supervisor of Santiago in 1898, and was promoted to School Medic Supervisor of Chile. Díaz held this position for more than 30 years. As a philanthropist, Díaz founded several kindergartens, polyclinics for the poor, and school camps.

In 1910, Díaz participated in the Hygiene and Medicine International Scientific Congress in Buenos Aires, where she was named "Illustrious Woman of America". Díaz was named Director of the School Medical Service of Chile in 1911, where she implemented school breakfasts and mass vaccination of students, as well as campaigns to combat alcoholism, rickets and tuberculosis.

In 1919, together with Celinda Arregui, Beatriz Letelier, Hayra Guerrero de Sommerville, Isaura Dinator, Juana de Aguirre Cerda, Carmela de Laso, and Fresia Escobar, among others, she founded the National Council of Women of Chile "which actively participated in the defense of women's rights".

Díaz retired in 1925. In 1950, she was taken ill and admitted to the San Vicente de Paúl Hospital, where she died at the age of 84.

== Tribute ==
La Florida "Dra. Eloísa Díaz Insunza" Hospital was inaugurated in November 2013.

On 25 June 2018, a Google Doodle celebrated her 152nd birthday.
