= Círculo de Estudios de la Mujer =

The Círculo de Estudios de la Mujer, or the Women’s Study Circle, was a Chilean feminist organization that existed from 1979 to 1983. It was formed during the Pinochet dictatorship in Chile as a response to the regime’s oppressive actions against citizens and women. For the Círculo women, the struggle for democracy and for women’s rights went hand-in-hand, and they also aimed to reframe feminism by prioritizing women as individuals, rather than their maternal identities. The Círculo de Estudios de la Mujer was part of a larger women’s movement which worked towards the end of the dictatorship, but they disbanded and formed two splinter groups in 1983.

== Origins ==
=== Background ===
The year 1915 saw the original formation of the Women’s Reading Circle (Círculo de Lectura de Señoras), which was modeled after various American women’s reading clubs. The club focused on the need to integrate women into the cultural and educational spheres of Chilean life. Various upper and middle-class women comprised the members of the club, who essentially felt the need to fill this educational and cultural ‘gap’ in their lives. These women questioned their exclusion from existing social life and its organization, which included female suffrage. In 1949, under President Gabriel González Videla, Chilean women won the right to vote in parliamentary and presidential elections, along with the right to participate in the political arena by running for any elected office, including that of the president. Following this victory, there was the eventual decline of autonomous Chilean women’s rights organizations.

These organizations had previously worked to ensure equal rights for women. However, by 1978, Chilean society continued to be a repressive space for women, and some women began to articulate their discontent with their subordinate position in Chilean society and the political sphere. These women that stood up did so in the face of derogatory labels and accusations laid on by the opposition. Tentative steps were taken by these women toward political organization on the basis of these concerns. This was the start of the re-emergence of the Chilean feminist movement in a public sphere that had been greatly reduced, within the context of the military regime.

=== Formation ===
Two of the founding members imported ideas from global feminist movements to Chile. Sociologist Julieta Kirkwood participated in the Latin American and Caribbean Feminist Meetings, where she gained intricate feminist knowledge such as in identifying violations against women including reproductive rights. Another founding member, Isabel Gannon, drew from ideas she encountered in California from 1967 to 1970, where she was introduced to the American feminist movement.

However, after the brief disappearance of Chilean feminist action from the public arena, a small group of five women that revived this organization in 1977. These women, who were friends and psychologists by profession, had in the past been active in left-wing political parties, and assembled every week to ‘discuss the malaise they were feeling’. The original intention was not to start a women’s consciousness-raising group, but eventually they incorporated new members from various professional backgrounds and became a group of fourteen. These women ranged from the ages of twenty-five and forty and were living the married life with children.

This relatively small group focused on reading and discussing articles that analyzed women’s opposition, oppression in daily life and questioned the female normative roles in Chilean society. They also generated material on the legal status of women, birth control, sexuality, women as objects of consumption, women and work, socialization, and female stereotypes. They had acquired five minutes of radio time, once a week for two months, they sent letters to the press (which were never published) discussing women’s inequality, and most notably, they circulated a petition opposing the 1978 labour legislation which eliminated maternity leave, despite the political repression that they faced. This petition received over a thousand signatures, was presented to the Minister of Labour, and was eventually published. About eight months into the formation of this group, the original members decided to branch out by establishing their own organizations. Eventually one of these sub-organizations collaborated with the Academia de Humanismo Cristiano (Academy of Christian Humanism), which was formed by Cardinal Raúl Silva Henríquez. Under the sponsorship of the Academy and its affiliate, the Vicaría de Solidaridad (Vicariate of Solidarity), and after a great deal of resistance, they received approval for the formation of a Commission to form the Women’s Studies Circle.

== Activities ==
The formation of the Circle, however, was dependent on the success of a panel to discuss the ‘situation of women in Chile’ sponsored by a core of twenty founding women. The panel was not expected to be a success, but received a turnout of 250-300 women, when the expected was 150. At this panel, women presented a document ‘Some Thoughts on the Condition of Women in Chile,’ which discussed how the oppressive gender roles of Chilean society had been internalized and the discrimination they faced in the labour force and in the law. The document also sheds light on the lack of value being placed in domestic work. This first public gathering organized by the Women’s Study Circle happened in 1979, in the space provided by the Academy of Christian Humanism.

Subsequently, they established that the Women’s Study Circle had to promote self-awareness (concientización) of the situation of Chilean women, which would be achieved through knowledge production and public engagement. Just in their first year, the Círculo activists rapidly grew and increased the number of workshops that were solely focused on specific issues such as on the history of women, women's labour, or the legal landscape of Chilean women. This strategy was utilized as a way to reclaim power within the patriarchal and oppressive Chilean sociopolitical and economic landscape. By promoting self-awareness and through knowledge production, they sought to create a sense of community where the many struggles of Chilean women were promoted as shared difficulties.

Other concrete measures of protest include public demonstrations, such as “The Marches of the Empty Bags” in which women flooded the farmers market without buying anything as a form of protest against food prices and shortages. This exercise of protest provided a framework where women became politically empowered, while emphasizing that public spaces were gendered and needed to be challenged. Their fourth public protest at Santiago's library, where Círculo women organized a five-minute sit-in, allowed the inclusion of Círculo women in the public discourse on gender roles. Although the Women's Study Circle were not targeted specifically, the Pinochet regime responded to all forms of public protests by attempting to suppress the outcries through killings, destroying homes, arrests, and disappearances.

The Women’s Study Circle also advocated for voluntary motherhood rather than prescribed motherhood dictated by patriarchal and Christian societal expectations. For instance, they sought to tackle the lack of access to information about family planning, contraceptive devices, cultural prejudices, and social norms. Although, Círculo feminists had to navigate and deal with an oppressive system that sought to muffle any dissidence through executions and disappearances. Feminist scholars Jadwiga E. Pieper Mooney and Jean Campbell argued that the Pinochet regime contradicted itself by seeking to both keep the family as the nucleus of Chilean society in the private sphere, while at the same time undermining the social institution of the family public policy. In other words, the Pinochet regime emphasized the “natural” role of women, which morally binds them as mothers and providers of moral guidance, while failing to promote and maintain the ideal that they sought to establish.

In the early twentieth century, the Chilean feminist movement’s ideology went along the lines of either secular or Christian beneficent maternalism which is defined as “any organized activism on the part of women who claim that they possess gendered qualifications to understand and assist less-fortunate women, and especially, children. Then, the Women's Study Circle steered away from beneficent maternalism by placing women at the forefront of the public discourse, rather than accepting the prescribed role of women as mothers. Chilean women faced hardship due to harsh economic conditions as men were disproportionately absent from the household, caused by a high rate of incarceration. The “Women first, then mothers" ideology consisted of a departure from traditional Christian gender roles that imposed a form of beneficent humanism onto Chilean women. Moreover, this ideology broke from all democratic tradition by challenging the conceived idea of the peaceful family that the patriarchal and religious order claimed to protect. Also, the Women’s Study Circle’s feminist narrative conflicted with the regime’s construction of social and gender norms.

== Dissolution ==
In 1982, Julieta Kirkwood, one of the organization’s founders, wrote an article titled “Divorce, another issue Adjourned” for Círculo’s diaries, which initiated Círculo’s the falling out with the Academy of Christian Humanism. The situation worsened when the Catholic Church publicly criticized some of the initiatives led by the Círculo in 1983. Their workshops on women’s sexuality and discussions of the problems of abortion, as well as the vote to legalize divorce, were all against the views of the Church and led the organization to be expelled from the Academy. Although, the radicalization was not specific to the Women’s Study Circle, but part of the larger Chilean feminist movement. As a result, two different organizations emerged: Casa de la Mujer La Morada (The Woman’s House of Dwelling) and Centro de los Estudios de la Mujer (Women’s Studies Centre). Both organizations continued to work towards ending the dictatorship and establishing democracy, but focused on different areas of women’s interests. The Woman’s House of Dwelling was primarily focused on activism and kept close connections to grassroots feminists, while the latter continued contributing to feminist knowledge and research as a think tank.

== Legacy ==
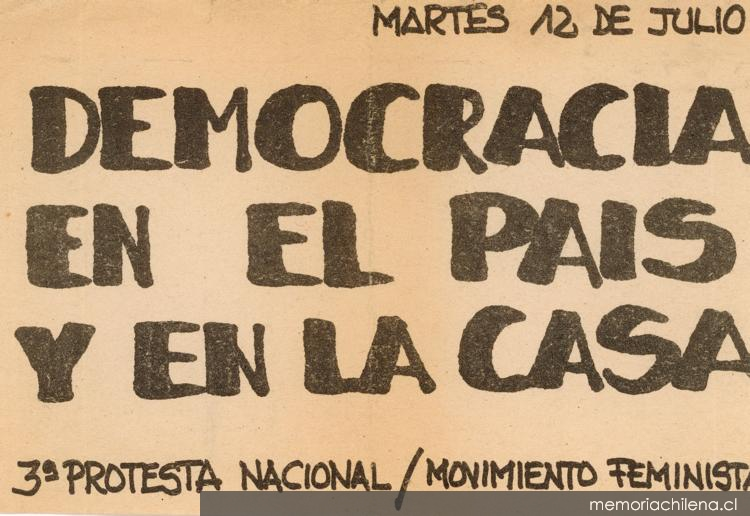
Democracia en el Pais y en casa

Círculo de Estudios de la Mujer was the first openly feminist organization at the time of its creation, which played a major role in bringing women’s rights issues to the mainstream. Its members were women from different social and economic backgrounds, who were taking tasks beyond their traditional domestic roles. The 1980s in Chile were a time for robust women’s activism against the dictatorship and gendered bias. Women from different social and economic backgrounds mobilized to show the seriousness and strength of their movement. Círculo’s call for arms, “democracia en el Pais y en casa,” — democracy in the country and at home — solidified its legacy in pursuing equality for all women. Círculo was one of the prominent feminist organizations which normalized women making political demands. Another impact of the Círculo de Estudios de la Mujer is the reframing of women’s rights outside of “motherhood” and “women’s rights as mothers”. The organization was successful in challenging women’s collective identities as mothers and connected it to the larger political discourse. They criticized the “exploitation of women’s reproductive labour” as a patriarchal need for the domestication of women and the violent political regime. Círculo’s activists were able to put women’s rights at the core of a new era of politics in Chile in the 1990s, and stressed the importance of gender equity in a democratic society. The National Office for Women's Affairs was established in 1991 as a result of a continued push of feminist organizations for women’s equality, signifying its progress. In 2006, Michelle Bachelet was elected as the first female president in Chile, representing how much women’s involvement in politics has gained prominence in Chile following the end of the dictatorship in 1990.

== See also ==
- Feminism
- Feminism in Chile
- Women in Chile
- History of feminism
- Julieta Kirkwood
- Military dictatorship of Chile (1973–1990)

== Bibliography ==
- Baldez, Lisa (2002). Why Women Protrest: Women's Movements in Chile. New York: Cambridge University Press.
- Chuchryk, Patricia (1985). Protest, Politics and Personal Life: The Emergence of Feminism in a Military Dictatorship, Chile 1973-1983.
- Molony, Barbara; Nelson, Jennifer, eds. (2017). Women's Activism and "Second Wave" Feminism: Transnational Histories. London: Bloomsbury Publishing Plc. doi:10.1093/ahr/122.4.1362b. ISBN 9781474250535.
- Pieper Mooney, Jadwiga E. (2020). Ramm, Alejandra; Gideon, Jasmine (eds.). "Taking the Nature Out of Mother": From Politics. Cham: Palgrave Macmillan.
- Pieper Mooney, Jadwiga E.; Campbell, Jean (2009). Feminist Activism and Women's Rights Mobilization in the Chilean Circulo de Estudios de la Mujer: Beyond Maternalist Mobilization. Ann Arbor, MI: University of Michigan.
- Pieper Mooney, Jadwiga E. (2010). "Forging Feminisms Under Dictatorship: Women's International Ties and National Feminist Empowerment in Chile, 1973-1990". Women's History Review. 19 (4): 613–630. doi:10.1080/09612025.2010.502406.
- Tobar, Marcela Rios (2003). ""Feminism is Socialism, Liberty, and Much More:" Second-Wave Chilean Feminism and its Contentious Relationship with Socialism". Journal of Women's History. 15 (3): 129–134. doi:10.1353/jowh.2003.0085. ISSN 1527-2036. S2CID 144225258 – via Project Muse.
