= Unión Femenina de Chile =

Chilean women's rights union

Unión Femenina de Chile ("Chile's Women's Union") was a women's feminist organization in Chile, founded in 1928 and based in the city of Valparaíso. It existed until 1935.

It was founded by Graciela Lacoste Navarro in 1928 after having been suggested by her in 1927 at a celebration convened by Aurora Argomedo to commemorate the fiftieth anniversary of the signing of the Amunátegui Decree in the city of Viña del Mar. The 1877 Amunátegui Decree had allowed women to study at Chilean universities.

The organization campaigned for women's political rights and emancipation, women's social, financial and educational rights, as well as for women's suffrage, particularly influencing public opinion in Valparaíso. Presided over by the journalist and writer Isabel Morel, it was an organization largely composed of Valparaíso's elite professional women, though it aimed to bring together all women regardless of their economic or social status. It published the newspaper Unión Femenina de Chile and the weekly Nosotras (feminine "Us"), both directed by Morel.

== Background ==
During the first decades of the 20th century, numerous civic feminist organizations were founded throughout Chile, seeking to improve women's conditions in different aspects of social and political life at the time. Many of them emerged in the context of the social demands of the labour movement in Chile, such as the Belén de Zárraga Centers in Iquique or El Despertar de la Mujer in Valparaíso (1913), while others arose among women of the emerging middle class, in intellectual circles generally progressive in character and with strong civic activity, such as the Club Social de Señoras ("Ladies' Social Club"), the Círculo de Lectura ("Reading Circle") in the city of Santiago, or the Liga de Mujeres Librepensadoras ("League of Free-thinking Women") in Valparaíso.

== Political participation ==
Together with other feminist groups, it formed broader associations to fight for women's suffrage. The association's newspapers contributed to women's insertion into national political life, even when they were not yet allowed to vote, by joining the electoral campaigns of the presidential candidates they supported, as occurred with the Radical candidate Juan Esteban Montero.

== Ideas and influences ==
The main focus of the Unión Femenina de Chile was the struggle for women's political rights, particularly the right to vote in Chile. However, during its existence it also worked on various social causes such as improving health and subsistence conditions, always keeping women's situation as its main concern, organizing courses and lectures aimed at female audiences, as well as a women's production and consumer cooperative intended to alleviate times of scarcity.
