= Amanda Labarca =

Amanda Labarca Hubertson
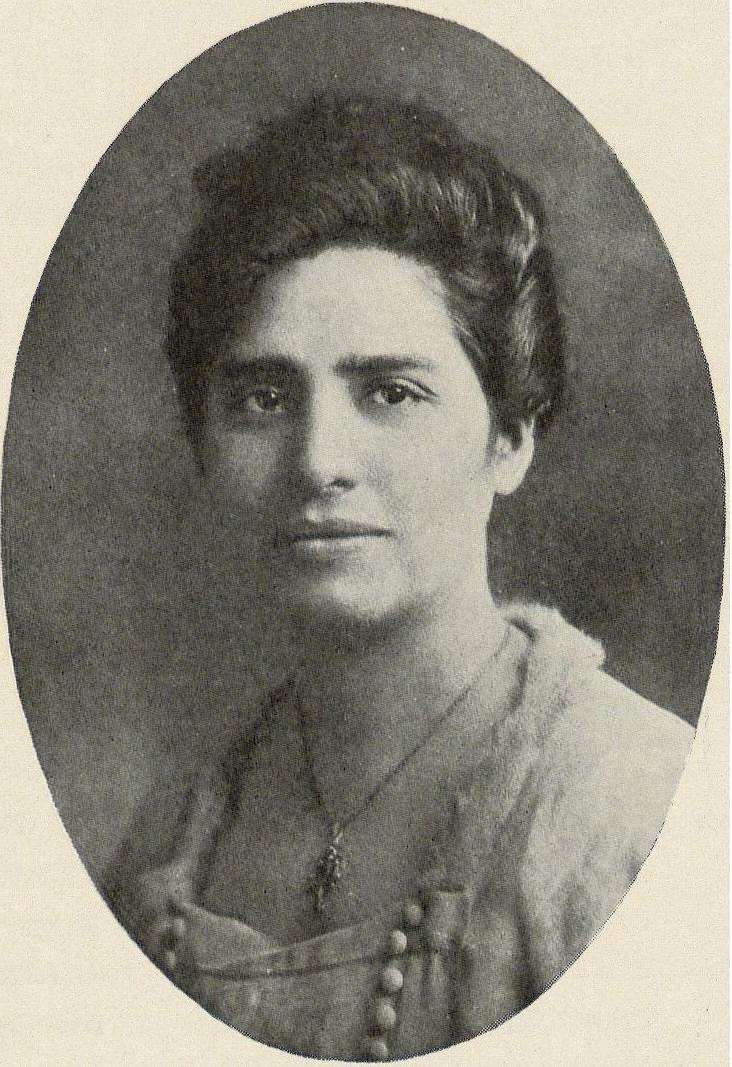
- Born: Pinto Sepúlveda; 5 December 1886; Santiago, Chile
- Died: 2 January 1975 (aged 88); Santiago, Chile
- Education: University of Chile, Columbia University, Sorbonne University
- Occupations: Educator, Diplomat, Writer
- Spouse: Guillermo Labarca Hubertson

Amanda Labarca Hubertson (Spanish pronunciation: [aˈmanda laˈβaɾka]; 5 December 1886 – 2 January 1975), was a Chilean diplomat, educator, writer and feminist. Her work was directed mainly at improving the situation of Latin American women and women's suffrage in Chile.

She was born Pinto Sepúlveda in Santiago, Chile, on December 5, 1886. Labarca's parents were Onofre Pinto Perez de Arce and Sabina Sepulveda. She adopted her husband's two surnames, Labarca Hubertson, after her marriage to Guillermo Labarca Hubertson during a trip to the U.S., amongst protest from her family.

== Education ==
She received her early education at a school on San Isidro Street, in Santiago, and then continued her education at the Isabel Le Brun de Pinochet Lyceum. She obtained a BA in Humanities in 1902. In 1905 she graduated as a teacher of the State with a concentration in Castilian, graduating from the Pedagogical Institute of the University of Chile.

In 1910, she traveled with her husband to the U.S. to continue her studies at Columbia University, and in 1912, in France at the Sorbonne University to major in education.

== Career ==
In 1915, when Labarca was still a student, she organized the Reading Circle inspired by the Reading Clubs of America. This organization allowed her to bring education and culture to women regardless of their status, who at that time were excluded. From the Reading Circle she developed the National Council of Women in 1919, participating in it with Celinda Reyes. In 1922 she obtained the position of Extraordinary Professor of Psychology at the Faculty of Philosophy, Humanities and Education at the University of Chile.

She joined the Radical Party as a militant. In 1922 she presented a project for improving the civil, political, and legal rights of women, which were restricted in the Civil Code of Chile (a struggle that would continue until the end of the century).

In 1925, she helped achieve the adoption of a legal decree known as the Maza Law (named after Senator José Maza) in the Civil Code that restricted the powers of custody of the father in favor of the mother. It enabled women to testify before the law and authorized married women to manage the fruits of their labor. As an educator she promoted the creation of the Experimental Manuel de Salas Lyceum for the training of future teachers in 1932. She was a founder of the National Committee for Women's Rights, created in 1933, along with Elena Caffarena and other women. She was appointed ambassador in 1946, by the government of President Gabriel González Videla, as the representative of Chile to the United Nations and head of the Status of Women section.

She was also a literary critic and a writer, dealing especially with the role of women in society. She directed the Reading Circle newspaper, the Women's Action, which had outstanding participation in the struggle for women's suffrage and fighting bribery (the sale of votes). As a result, in 1944, she was elected president of the Chilean Federation of Feminine Institutions. She established Summer Schools at the University of Chile. She taught courses and seminars in countries throughout the Americas. In 1964 she was honored as an Academic Member of the Faculty of Education at the University of Chile, and, in 1969, the Academy of Political Science, Sociology and Morals at the Chilean Institute.

== Legacy and recognition ==
She died in Santiago on January 2, 1975, at 88 years of age. Her legacy remains in many publications in favor of women's rights and education issues.

She was the first Latin American woman to pursue a university professorship. She wrote numerous books on education and feminism.

In 1976, the University of Chile founded the Amanda Labarca Award in her memory, designed to recognize the merits of a college woman once a year.

== Works ==
Her works include:

- Actividades femeninas en Estados Unidos (1915) – Feminine activities in America
- Adónde va la mujer (1934) – Where does the woman go
- Feminismo contemporáneo (1948) – Contemporary Feminism

Within her educational life she wrote:

- Bases para una política educacional (1944). – Foundations for an educational policy
- Historia de la enseñanza en Chile(1948) – History of education in Chile
- Impresiones de juventud – Youthhood Perspectives
- Meditaciones breves – Brief meditations
- Perspectiva de Chile – Perspective of Chile
- En tierras extrañas – In a strange lands
- La lámpara maravillosa – The Wonderful Lamp
- Cuentos a mi señor – Tales for my lord
