= Isabel Morel =

Chilean writer, journalist, editor and feminist activist

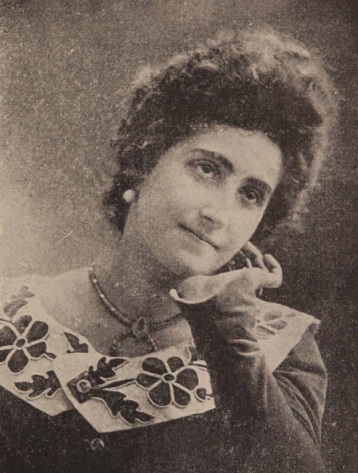
- Born: 1885; Valparaíso, Chile

Delia Ducoing de Arrate (1885–1947), better known as Isabel Morel, was a Chilean writer, journalist, editor and feminist activist. She was best known for her work on behalf of women's rights in the political, social and civil sphere in Chile since 1914. On October 26, 1927, she founded the Women's Union of Chile in the city of Valparaíso with Gabriela Mandujano and Aurora Argomedo, assuming its presidency on May 6, 1928. As a writer, one of her best known works is the book Charlas femeninas (1930), one of the first publications which systematized feminist thought in Chile. She also wrote and edited the magazine Nosotras in the early 1930s.

== Selected works ==
- Charlas Femeninas (1930)
- El libertador del Hada de Plata (1943)
