= María Rivera (activist) =

Chilean political activist

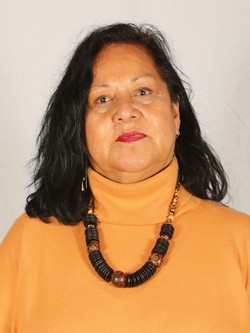

Member of the Constitutional Convention
- In office 4 July 2021 – 4 July 2022
- Constituency: 8th District

Personal details
- Born: 28 January 1958 (age 68) Santiago, Chile
- Other political affiliations: The List of the People (2020–2021)
- Education: Bolivarian University of Chile (LL.B)
- Occupation: Political activist
- Profession: Lawyer

María Rivera Iribarren (born 28 January 1958) is a Chilean human rights lawyer, activist, and independent politician.

She was elected as a member of the Constitutional Convention in 2021, representing the 8th District of the Metropolitan Region of Santiago.

== Biography ==
Rivera was born in Santiago on 28 January 1958. She is the daughter of María Salomé Iribarren and Orlando Rivera. She is divorced and has one child.

Rivera studied law at the Bolivarian University of Chile. She was admitted to the Chilean bar after taking the oath before the Supreme Court of Justice on 25 July 2012.

In her professional career, she has focused on the legal defense of political prisoners, social and trade union leaders, and workers, primarily through the organization Defensa Popular (formerly Defensoría Popular).

== Political career ==
Rivera began her political activism in 1972 within the Revolutionary Student Front (FER), linked to the Revolutionary Left Movement (MIR). In 1980, she was detained by the National Intelligence Center (CNI) during the military dictatorship.

In 1983, she went into exile in Argentina and returned to Chile in 1990, subsequently joining the Chilean section of the International Workers League – Fourth International (LIT-CI), known locally as the Workers' International Movement (MIT). In 2004, the National Commission on Political Imprisonment and Torture (Valech Commission) officially recognized her as a victim of the civic–military dictatorship.

In 2008, she founded the Defensoría Popular, later renamed Defensa Popular.

In the elections held on 15–16 May 2021, Rivera ran as an independent candidate for the Constitutional Convention representing the 8th District of the Metropolitan Region, as part of The People's List (Lista del Pueblo). She obtained 18,691 votes, corresponding to 4.13% of the valid votes cast, and was elected as a member of the Convention. which was formalized in early 2021 when it was reported that she will run for the 8th District.
