= María de la Cruz =

Chilean activist

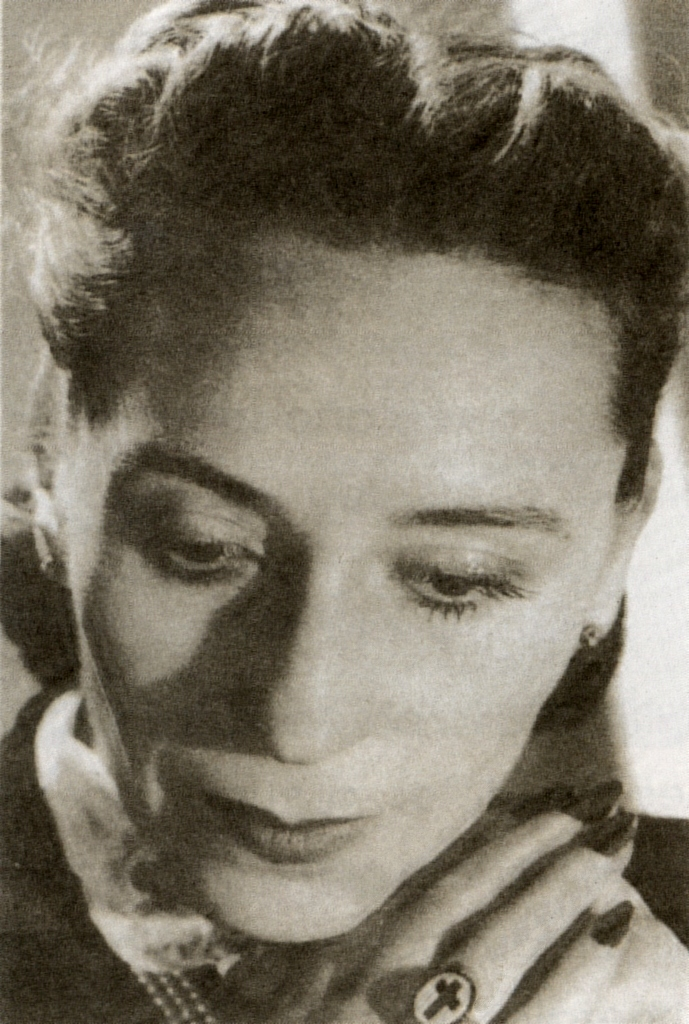

Member of the Senate
- In office 13 February 1953 – 4 August 1953

Personal details
- Born: 18 September 1912 Chimbarongo, Chile
- Died: 1 September 1995 (aged 82) Santiago, Chile
- Occupation: Politician, Suffragist, Journalist
- Known for: first woman elected to the Chilean Senate

María de la Cruz Toledo (September 18, 1912 – September 1, 1995) was a Chilean political activist for women's suffrage, a journalist, a writer, and a political commentator. In 1953, she became the first woman ever elected to the Chilean Senate.

== Early life ==
De la Cruz was born in Chimbarongo, Chile, the daughter of Marco Aurelio de la Cruz and Edicia Toledo. She studied at the Colegio Rosa de Santiago Concha and the Liceo Nº5 of Santiago. From a very young age, she wrote articles and poems. In 1940, she published a book of poems (Transparencias de un Alma), and in 1942, a short novel (Alba de Oro). She was also the publisher and editor of the magazine Luz y sombra (Light and Shadows), dedicated to promote culture among and understanding of blind people. As a radio journalist, she made a name for herself in Radio "Nuevo Mundo", where her daily magazine program María de la Cruz habla (María de la Cruz Speaks Out) was a great success.

== Political career ==
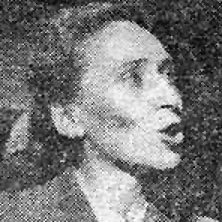
María De la Cruz.

Through her radio program and her writings, she focused on increasing the political participation of women in politics and exposed the struggle of Chilean women to obtain the right to vote. In 1946, de la Cruz founded the Feminine Party of Chile. These actions were the culmination of a long struggle that began in 1913 and ended in 1949, when President Gabriel González Videla signed the law that granted the right to vote in all elections to women in Chile.

The Feminine Party grew up very quickly among middle-class and working women. In 1948, de la Cruz ran for a senate seat, but even though she had the support of Carlos Ibáñez del Campo, she lost the election. During the 1952 presidential election, she became Ibáñez's campaign manager. After he won the presidency, he offered her a position in his cabinet as Minister of Education, but she refused, nominating instead María Teresa del Canto from her own party.

Ibáñez then backed her as a candidate to replace him in the senate. She also obtained the support of the Partido Democrático de Chile, the Movimiento Nacional Independiente, the Organización de Mujeres Independientes, the Movimiento Nacional Ibañista, and her own Partido Femenino, being elected senator on January 4, 1953, the first woman ever to reach the Chilean senate. She won with 107,585 votes to the runner-up's 68,350, the highest margin ever obtained at that point.

She was duly sworn in and took her place on February 13, 1953. Nonetheless, her political career ended abruptly a few months later. Her powerful oratory gained her suspicion and enmity from all political sectors. Three women accused her to be involved in the smuggling of watches from Argentina. These accusations grew until they became the Watches affair. On August 4, 1953, she was indicted and stripped of her position for "abusing her position for personal gain", even though the congressional investigation had voted against that measure. The affair eventually dissolved and nothing was ever proved against her. There seems to be little doubt now that the accusations were politically motivated in order to remove her from Congress.

== Aftermath ==
The impact of her fall quickly affected her party and it started to dissolve almost immediately. By 1954, it had ceased to exist. In the 1958 presidential election, she supported Jorge Alessandri, and in the 1964 presidential election, Jorge Prat, but she never managed to regain her former political influence. Eventually, she joined the National Party and was one of the leaders behind the empty-pots movement against Salvador Allende.

She continued her radio program until 1978, when she retired. She died in Santiago at the age of 83 in 1995.

== See also ==
- Carlos Ibáñez del Campo
- Amanda Labarca
- Elena Caffarena
- Chilean political scandals
