= National Council of Women (Chile) =

National Council of Women (Spanish: Consejo Nacional de Mujeres de Chile) was a women's organization in Chile, founded in 1919. It was one of the first women's organizations in Chile, and played a dominant role in the campaign for women's suffrage in Chile.

== History ==
The National Council of Women was created by the merge of two women's organizations founded in 1915. The Women's Reading Circle or Círculo de Lectura de Senoras, founded in Santiago by Amanda Labarca, and the Club de Senoras (Women's Club), a women's reading circle founded by upper-class women. Both promoted women's suffrage, and when the Women's Club asked the Conservative Party to support women's suffrage, they were threatened by the church with excommunication. After this, the two women's organizations merged to found the National Council of Women in 1919.

It was not the only woman's organization, as the Civico Femeninio (Women's Civic Party) was founded the same year, but it was to be the dominant women's organization in Chile. It was also the first organized women's suffrage organization in Chile.

It also worked for a change of the civil code to improve women's rights, particularly to abolish the patria potestad, in which women were under the guardianship of their husbands. In 1925, it helped achieve the adoption of a legal decree known as the Maza Law (named after Senator José Maza) in the Civil Code that restricted the powers of custody of the father in favor of the mother. It enabled women to testify before the law and authorized married women to manage the fruits of their labor. It was supported by Pedro Aguirre Cerda and Arturo Alessandri, then President of the Republic.

It promoted a moderate and gradual progression toward equality. In accordance with this, they supported that the suffrage be introduced gradually, with municipal suffrage introduced before full national suffrage. Women's suffrage was introduced on municipial level in Chile in 1931, and on national level in 1949.

== See also ==
- Comité Nacional pro Derechos de la Mujer
- Federación Chilena de Instituciones Femeninas
