= Olga Poblete =

Women's rights activist

Olga Poblete de Espinosa (May 21, 1908 – July 17, 1999) was a long-time women's rights activist and feminist in Chile. She was a recipient of the Lenin Peace Prize in 1962. Poblete and Elena Caffarena were later honored as "founding matriarchs" by the Movimiento Pro-Emancipación de las Mujeres de Chile of '83 or MEMCH '83. This relates to them being important members of the original MEMCH that existed in the 1940s. Along with women's rights, she was concerned with individual development and welfare issues.
