= Partido Cívico Femenino =

Chilean women's organization

Partido Cívico Femenino, was a women's organization in Chile, founded in 1922.

It was founded by a group of women including Estela La Rivera de Sanhueza, Elvira de Vergara, Berta Recabarren and Graciela Lacoste Navarro.

It was the first political feminist party in the history of Chile. It was a secular organization and campaigned for women's rights and emancipation, women's social, financial and educational rights, coeducation, secularism and women's suffrage.

It was dissolved in 1939.

It published the feminist newspaper Acción Femenina as its media organ in 1922–1939.
