= Eulogia Román =

Eulogia Román was a Chilean labor and feminist activist, known for her work to promote women's rights. In the 1930s, she was one of the co-founders of the Pro-Emancipation Movement of Chilean Women.

== Biography ==
Eulogia Román was born into a peasant family in northern Chile.

At a young age, she moved to Santiago and began working there in the tobacco industry. She later worked as a lab assistant at the University of Chile's Institute of Physiology, and then as a traveling salesperson.

As a blue-collar worker, she became active in the Chilean labor movement. In 1926, she joined the women's propaganda committee of the Federación Obrera de Chile union federation. That same year, she became a member of the Communist Party of Chile.

Román was also active in Chile's nascent feminist movement. In 1935, she became a co-founder of the Pro-Emancipation Movement of Chilean Women (MEMCH), an organization of working-class women pushing for gender equality. She wrote for its publication, La Mujer Nueva.

Within MEMCH, Román was considered one of the group's most active and effective organizers. With both MEMCH and Chilean Federation of Women's Institutions, she helped organize lectures on feminist topics at the University of Chile. She also traveled the country giving talks about these issues in working-class neighborhoods and rural areas.

Román was a lesbian, and she faced discrimination within the Communist Party over her sexuality. She also criticized the party for insufficiently addressing issues of women's rights.
