= Comité Nacional pro Derechos de la Mujer =

Chilean women's organization

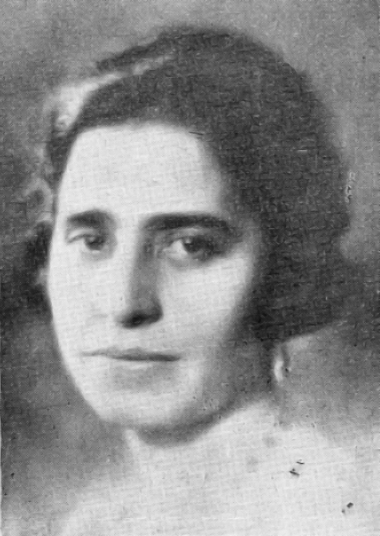
Amanda Labarca

Comité Nacional pro Derechos de la Mujer (Spanish: National Pro-Women’s Rights Committee) was a women's organization based in Chile founded in 1922.

The committee was formed by Felisa Vergara, Amanda Labarca and Elena Doll with the purpose of working for the introduction of female suffrage in Chile. The committee was instrumental in achieving female suffrage at the municipal level in 1934, while suffrage on a national level was enacted in 1949 following the efforts of the Federación Chilena de Instituciones Femeninas.
