= Chilean Federation of Women's Institutions =

Chilean women's rights organization (1944–1949)

Federación Chilena de Instituciones Femeninas (FECHIF) (Spanish: Chilean Federation of Women's Institutions) was a women's rights organization based in Chile and founded in 1944.

The FECHIF functioned as an umbrella organization of the Chilean women's movement during the final campaign for the suffrage and basic rights of women. Suffrage had been introduced at the municipal level in 1931, partially after the campaign by Comité Nacional pro Derechos de la Mujer, but had not yet been recognized at a national level. The organization's efforts began in 1944 and lasted until the establishment of women's suffrage in Chile in 1949.

== Context ==
Worldwide, the 20th century saw a trend of increasing women's rights, and the period from 1930 to 1940 would be a time of intense activity from female organizations. FECHIF itself was preceded by the creation of the Pro-Emancipation Movement of Chilean Women (MEMCH) in 1935, which sought to organize and create a progressive conscience in the country. The movement would come to actively promote and participate in FECHIF matters.

== Goals and Ideals ==
The enactment of municipal women's suffrage in 1931 was simply a prelude for realizing nationwide suffrage for Chilean women. In January 1941, Chilean President Pedro Aguirre Cerda, together with FECHIF, presented to the Senate a plan written by Elena Caffarena and Flor Heredia to allow female voting. This plan was never brought to discussion.

The First Women's National Congress (Spanish: Primer Congreso Nacional de Mujeres) was held in Santiago between October and November 1944 and was fundamental in consolidating a unity of women's organizations. This meeting directly led to the creation of FECHIF with the principal goal of fighting for political rights for women, mainly suffrage.

While the women's organizations of this era had a democratic discourse, the MEMCH and FECHIF were two of several organizations that differed in their notions of democracy.

== Achievements and Weakening ==
The FECHIF and other organizations succeeded in creating a collective progress consciousness among women regardless of social class or political affiliation, although the movement was led by high-class and middle-class women. Nevertheless, the movement would leave an impact lasting for many years, eventually succeeding in gaining women's suffrage nationwide in 1949.

However, FECHIF was gravely weakened in 1946 under the administration of Radical President Gabriel González Videla. Tensions provoked by polarization and the Cold War influenced Videla to take an anti-communist position and issue the Law of Permanent Defense of Democracy in 1948, banning the Communist Party of Chile. This action produced a schism within the FECHIF, pressuring them to remove their left-wing branch. The MEMCH, who previously worked in parallel with FECHIF, publicly denounced the arbitrary expulsion of the activists and withdrew. This grave loss caused a permanent division within the Federation, ultimately bringing it to its end.
