= Pro-Emancipation Movement of Chilean Women =

Pro-Emancipation Movement of Chilean Women (Spanish: Movimiento Pro-Emancipación de las Mujeres de Chile; often known as MEMCh or MEMCH) was both a historic women's rights organization, which pressed for equality between 1935 and 1953 and a current umbrella organization reorganized in 1983 to organize other women's organizations to provide unity in the struggle for the country to return to democracy. Once the dictatorship was overturned, the NGO turned its focus to uniting organizations which pursue a broad spectrum of issues pertaining to women's rights and development.

== History ==
Pro-Emancipation Movement of Chilean Women or MEMCh was created on 28 May 1935 by a group of mostly working class women, many of whom were members of or sympathizers with the Chilean Communist Party; however, their goal was to have broad membership representing all aspects of the nation. It was the first women's group formed in Chile with specific political goals and an organizational strategy to become a national organization, rather than a local club. The journal, The New Woman (Spanish: La Mujer Nueva) was created by the organization as a means of publishing their views on feminist issues. Its leadership was composed of some of Chile's pioneering feminists and included Elena Caffarena, Graciela Mandujano, Olga Poblete, Marta Vergara, Laura Rodig, and Eulogia Román, among others. Its first general secretary and founder was Caffarena, who served in that capacity from 1935 to 1941.

The organization was considered radical for its era, in that the women wanted full emancipation of their economic, civic and political spheres, recognizing that to attain those goals, radical changes must occur in all structures of society. Because the organization was heavily joined by working class women, they stressed the importance of equal pay and elimination of segregation which barred women's participation in certain jobs based on marital or other status. Related concerns were state-sponsored child care and maternity benefits, as well as the right of women to choose whether they would become mothers.

Support for contraception and regulation of clandestine abortions, since therapeutic abortion was already legal, caused some parts of society to accuse MEMCh members of wanting to destroy the traditions of family. In memchistas (MEMCh members) view, they saw controlling one's biology as a part of women's family rights, including child support, inheritance, legitimacy, pension rights and others. While they strove for women's suffrage, attaining the vote was only one step toward increasing women's participation in the public sphere. MEMCh members focused their efforts on women's issues throughout the social spectrum including the families of the urban poor, middle classes and educated elites. The social issues MEMCh supported were the availability of sanitary, affordable housing; assistance for alcoholism; reform of women's prisons; and equal access to education.

MEMCh was the first women's group to use mass mobilization through public events, held not only in Santiago but also in the provinces. They held rallies for votes and political freedom, and in favor of regulations dealing with the high unemployment and subsistence living; and others against a military pact between Chile and the United States, and sending Chilean troops to participate in the Korean War. MEMch developed an educational work, hosting schools for workers and job training courses, and created social service facilities to provide health care and legal advice.

In the 1940s, the organization strongly opposed fascism, but rumors and actual links with communism of some of the feminists led to public defamation of several members and press which was critical of their objectives. MEMch joined the Popular Front and held two congresses (1937, 1940) to gather information from various sectors to create a platform which would address the issues that women faced. When Pedro Aguirre Cerda was elected as president, he agreed to introduce the issue of women's right to vote. In 1941, Caffarena and Flor Heredia drafted a proposal for consideration, but Cerda died before it was introduced. In 1944, MEMCh organized a meeting held at the University of Chile in celebration of International Women's Day and that was followed by another congress, organized by Felisa Vergara. She brought together women from 200 different women's organizations, who agreed to align in an organization, Chilean Federation of Women's Institutions (Spanish: Federación Chilena de Instituciones Femeninas (FECHIF)).

FECHIF in turn backed the candidacy of María de la Cruz in 1946, but MEMCh adhered to the Popular Front candidate, Gabriel González Videla, believing that though charismatic, de la Cruz's vision was too narrow to support the needs of a wide constituency of women. After González Videla's election to the presidency in 1946, moderate members' relationships were strained by the anti-communist policies ushered in by the Cold War and the leftist leanings of many MEMch members.

In 1949, having survived the government decision to outlaw the Communist Party and state harassment aimed at curtailing its activities, Chilean women gained universal suffrage. Membership turned their attention to pacifism and campaigns to protect children. The organization survived until 1953, when it was dissolved. Though specific reasons for the dissolution are unknown, the political polarization and MEMCh's refusal to exclude anyone for their political views and factionalism dividing the focus to interest groups were contributing factors.

== Current Organization ==
In 1983, MEMCh83, named after the original organization, was founded by a broad spectrum of women's groups, some with feminist aims and others without feminist goals. The umbrella organization's purpose was to unite women's efforts in the restoration of democracy during the Chilean dictatorship of Augusto Pinochet. Initially the organization made no demands for women's rights, but when MEMCh83 organized its first mass mobilization on 28 November 1983, they expressed opposition to Pinochet and demanded peace and women's equality. In 1985, the organization was established as MEMch, under a non-governmental organizational structure. Since democracy was restored in 1988, the organization has focused on joining a broad coalition of Chilean NGOs in the advocacy of women's equality, which includes their reproductive and sexual rights, as well as all aspects of development.
