= Elena Caffarena =

Chilean lawyer, jurist and politician

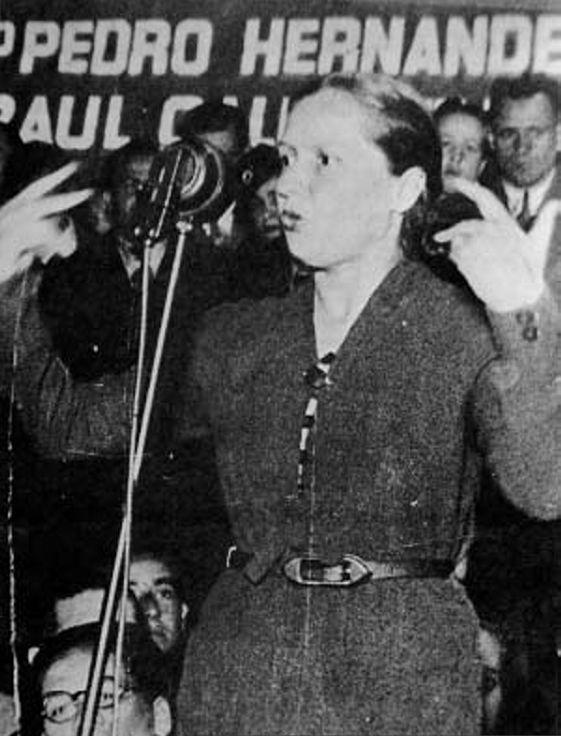
- Born: March 23, 1903; Iquique, Chile
- Died: July 19, 2003 (aged 100); Santiago, Chile
- Burial place: Cementerio General de Santiago
- Education: University of Chile
- Occupations: Attorney, Social Activist
- Spouse: Jorge Jiles (m. 1929)
- Relatives: Pamela Jiles (granddaughter); Ricardo Izurieta (nephew)

Elena Caffarena Morice (Latin American Spanish: [eˈlena kafaˈɾena]; March 23, 1903 - July 19, 2003) was a Chilean lawyer, jurist and politician. Contemporary historians and humanists consider her to be one of the most important 20th-century public figures in Chile.

== Biography ==
Elena Caffarena was born in Iquique, Chile, to Ana Morice and Blas Caffarena, an Italian immigrant. When Caffarena was young the family moved to Santiago from Iquique. Caffarena attended the University of Chile, and her time there was very influential in her career. When at college in her sophomore year she worked at Defensa Jurídica Gratuita (English: Free Legal Defense). During this work she met her husband, Jorge Jiles. Caffarena devoted much of her life to the struggle for women's emancipation. Her granddaughter is the journalist Pamela Jiles. Caffarena died on July 19, 2003, at the age of 100.

== Career and MEMCh ==
Caffarena and Olga Poblete were the founders of Movimiento Pro-Emancipación de las Mujeres de Chile (MEMCh) (English: Pro-Emancipation Movement of Chilean Women) in 1938 and were honored as "founding matriarchs" by MEMCh 1983. The MEMCh fought for many different women's rights issues including, workers rights, abortion rights, breastfeeding and also decreasing infant mortality rates. The main motivations of Caffarena and MEMCh were to increase democracy in Chile this is within and outside of the home. The MEMCh's goal was not to completely over through the social system but to point out the flaws in the system. MEMCh created a monthly bulletin called La Mujer Nueva that covers a range of topics from discussing the issues faced during daily life of women to international politics. Caffarena herself was a major advocate for women to be financially independent from their husbands. Caffarena was very curious about what the possible reason could be to keep women out of politics.

During the Pinochet Dictatorship (1973–1990), Caffarena ran a series of organizations out of her own house, which was within a Seminary. Two of the organizations she founded and ran Comité de Defensa de los Derechos del Pueblo (CODEPU) (English: Committee in Defense of the Rights of the People), and Fundación para la Protección de la Infancia Dañada por los Estados de Emergencia (PIDEE) (English: Foundation for the Protection of Children Damaged by States of Emergency). Both of these organizations goals was to help the repressed under Augusto Pinochet.

Her work let her interface with politicians. An example of this is when President González Videla was speaking to the Second National Congress of Women, Caffarena and her followers were in attendance. At one point during his speech he mentioned that he would use the army against the Chilean people for order to remain. At this point in the speech Caffarena interrupted and voiced her concerns, left in protest with a large group of women flowing her out.

== Selected works ==
- Capacidad de la mujer casada en relación a sus bienes (1944)
- Regímenes matrimoniales en Latinoamérica (1948)
- Un capítulo en la Historia del Feminismo. Las sufragistas inglesas (1952)
- El recurso de amparo frente a los regímenes de emergencia (1957)
- Diccionario de Jurisprudencia Chilena" (1959)
