= Corina Rodríguez López =

Costa Rican educator, writer, and feminist

- Born: Corina Rodríguez López; 25 December 1895; San Ramón, Costa Rica
- Died: 8 November 1982 (aged 86); San José, Costa Rica
- Other names: Corina Rodriguez López de Palmer; Corina Rodriguez López de Cornick; Corina Rodríguez de Odin
- Occupation(s): educator, writer, feminist, suffragette, housing activist
- Years active: 1922-1974

Corina Rodríguez López (1895–1982) was a Costa Rican educator, writer, feminist and occasional sculptor. She was the founder of the Casa del Niño and the Temperance League of Costa Rica, as well as a feminist and suffragette. She was twice exiled for her outspokenness on the treatment of women and children and her political views. She taught school in both Costa Rica and Panama and wrote articles for newspapers and magazines criticizing both national and international political policies. When she returned from exile in Panama, she worked as a housing advocate for poor families in the southern neighborhoods of San José. She was inducted into the Costa Rican Gallery of Women in 2007.

== Biography ==
Corina Rodríguez López was born on 25 December 1895 in San Ramón, Alajuela Province, Costa Rica to Joaquín Rodríguez Rodríguez and Juana López Castro. Her primary schooling was completed at the Central Girls' School in San Ramon. She attended the Colegio de Señoritas from 1910 to 1914 and then the Escuela Normal from 1914 to 1915, graduating as a teacher. During the first administration of Ricardo Jiménez Oreamuno she founded the Casa del Niño (House of Children) and co-founded the Temperance League. She was a supporter of Alfredo González Flores and when he was ousted from office by a coup d'état she was sent into exile by the Tinoco dictatorship. She went to the United States and enrolled first in Mount St. Mary Academy in Somerset County, New Jersey, from which she graduated in 1920 and subsequently enrolled at Northwestern University in Chicago, graduating in 1921 with master's degrees in English, education and psychology.

Rodríguez returned to Costa Rica and began teaching at the Escuela de Aplicación de Heredia, directed by Omar Dengo and later at the Normal School, the Liceo de Costa Rica, and was director of the Superior School for Young Ladies. She began writing and publishing numerous pieces in newspapers, including political essays and literary criticisms. From at least as early as 1922, she was publishing articles in the American Repertory criticizing the treatment of women and children, abandonment of children, alcoholism, as well as analyses of international politics. She also directed the Biblical Institute and served as the director of the Inter-American Office of Education. In 1923, the Liga Feminista Costarricense (LFC), first feminist organization in Costa Rica, was founded by Ángela Acuña Braun and Rodríguez joined the organization. She was involved in many protests of the league's protests with Acuña, Ana Rosa Chacón and Carmen Lyra. She continued with journalism for 16 years in various newspapers and magazines and in 1929 published a book of poems and book dealing with social themes.

In May 1943 Rodríguez helped organize the largest parade of protest against the reform of the electoral law for the Legislative Assembly. She also attended the Primer Congreso Interamericano de Mujeres held in Guatemala City, Guatemala in 1947 with the goals of pushing for regional enfranchisement, peace, political equality, and security of human welfare. In 1948, during the Costa Rican Civil War, she was imprisoned in El Buen Pastor and exiled to Panama. She joined the feminist movement there and worked as a Spanish teacher in the Canal Zone and also taught English at the National Institute. While in Panama, she took advanced courses in ceramics and sculpture.

When she was able to return to Costa Rica in the first part of the 1970s, Rodríguez began working for the National Institute of Housing and Urbanism (INVU). Between 1970 and 1974, she worked in the southern neighborhoods of San José, fighting for proper housing for the poor and a neighborhood was later named in her honor there.

Rodríguez was married three times. Many of her writings were published under the name of Corina Rodriguez López de Cornick. She died on 8 November 1982 in San José, Costa Rica. In 2007, she was inducted into the Gallery of Women at the National Institute for Women.
