= Sara Casal de Quirós =

Costa Rican teacher, writer and community worker

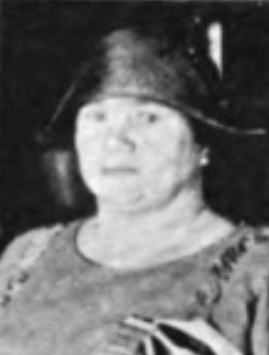
- Casal in 1922
- Born: Sara Rosa Zoila Casal Conejo; 6 September 1879; San José, Costa Rica
- Died: 17 November 1953 (aged 74); San José, Costa Rica
- Other names: Sara Casal, Sara Casal v. de Quirós
- Occupations: teacher, writer, community worker, women's rights activist

Sara Casal de Quirós (6 September 1879 – 17 November 1953) was a Costa Rican teacher, writer and community worker. She was a pioneer of the women's rights movement in Costa Rica and wrote the first book defending women's rights in the country.

== Early life ==
Sara Rosa Zoila Casal Conejo was born on 6 September 1879 in San José, Costa Rica to Rafaela Conejo and Carlos Casal. She married Teodoro Quirós Blanco (1876–1902), but became a widow at the age of 23. By profession, Casal was a sewing instructor.

== Activism ==
A member of the charitable society Damas de San Vicente de Paul (Ladies of San Vicente de Paul), in 1913, Casal de Quirós worked with Ángela Acuña Braun, Ana Rosa Chacón, and Marian Le Cappellain to found the program "La Gota de Leche" (A Drop of Milk), which provided milk to disadvantaged children and taught women about breastfeeding and proper nutrition. She also was a secretary of the Liga de Acción Social de Damas Católicas (League for Social Action of Catholic Ladies) and in 1921 worked with Amparo de Zeledón to bring the Sisters of Jesus the Good Shepherd from León, Nicaragua to attend to the inmates in the women's prison. In 1922, Casal de Quirós and Acuña traveled to the United States attending the Pan-American Conference of Women hosted by the National League of Women Voters in Baltimore, visited Boston, and then attended the Pan American Women's Conference in New York City.

Along with Acuña, Chacón, Esther de Mezerville, and other graduates, students, and teachers from the Colegio Superior de Señoritas, in 1923, Casal de Quirós became a founding member of the Liga Feminista Costarricense (Costa Rican Feminist League), the first feminist organization in Costa Rica. In 1925, she founded the Consejo nacional de mujeres de Costa Rica (National Council of Costa Rican Women) and published, El voto femenino (The Female Vote) the first booklet defending the civil and political rights of women in Costa Rica. It was widely distributed among educators, feminists, and politicians, and frequently discussed in the press. She advocated for a restricted vote for women, limiting participation to those who were educated or who had sufficient life experience, like mothers and widows.

Casal de Quirós was outspoken in her defense of the right of women to vote, believing that women had a moral nature which was crucial for shaping society. Along with the Liga, she supported laws which provided for the care of abandoned children, for removal of discriminatory pay scales for women, and for the political enfranchisement of women. From 1924, women's suffrage legislation was introduced by the Liga and its supporters to the legislature in 1925, 1929, 1931, 1932, 1934 and 1939, without success. She published articles in various newspapers, like La Tribuna, throughout the 1920s and in April 1931 became the director and editor-in-chief of Revista costarricense (Costa Rican Magazine), continuing as director until 1948, when the publication ceased production. The magazine aimed to address a wide range of women's issues from home management, to education, to hygiene and childcare, to civic responsibilities, and the moral and religious development of women and children.

== Death and legacy ==
Casal de Quirós died on 17 November 1953 at the Hospital San Juan de Dios in San José and was buried in El Carmen the following day. Along with Acuña, de Chacón, and de Messerville, she is remembered as one of the leading feminists of her era in Costa Rica.
