= Mary Coco Maltez de Callejas =

Nicaraguan teacher and activist

- 1969
- Born: Pura María del Socorro Maltez Huezo; 7 March 1925; Managua, Nicaragua
- Died: 22 February 2016 (aged 90); Managua, Nicaragua
- Other names: Mary Coco Maltez Callejas
- Occupation(s): teacher, politician
- Years active: 1943-1979

Mary Coco Maltez de Callejas (7 March 1925 – 22 February 2016) was a Nicaraguan feminist, teacher and politician of the Somozista Nationalist Liberal Party. She was a founding member of both the Union of American Women and Ala Femenina, serving as the vice president of the latter organization from its founding in 1955 to 1971, when she became president. She was one of the first three women to run for and be elected to the Chamber of Deputies in 1957. After her initial election, she served in the National Assembly until 1979. Between 1969 and 1979, she served as the Minister of Education. In her latter years, she participated in the Alliance of Pan American Round Tables.

== Early life ==
Pura María del Socorro Maltez Huezo, known as Mary Coco, was born on 7 March 1925, in Managua, Nicaragua to Isabel Huezo and Manuel Maltez. She was one of the founding members of the Union of American Women (Spanish: Union de Mujeres Americanas, organized by Josefa Toledo de Aguerri in 1942. She graduated from the Escuela Normal Central in Managua in 1943.

== Career ==
Maltez began her career as a teacher and in 1950, married Reinaldo Santiago Jose Jimmy Callejos Callejos. In 1955, along with Clementina Arcia, Gladys Bonilla Muñoz, Amelia Borge de Sotomayor, Esperanza Centeno Sequeira, Zaida Fernandez de Ruiz, Evelina Mayorga, Lucrecia Noguera Carazo, Olga Núñez Abaunza, Ofelia Padilla, and Gloria Zeledón, Maltez de Callejas founded the magazine, Ala Femenina, as the press organ of the organization by the same name. While a feminist organization, the group was a partisan organization and devoted to liberalism and the Nationalist Liberal Party, with the majority of its members were middle-class professional women. From the organization's founding, Maltez de Callejas served as the vice president, until the death of president Olga Núñez Abaunza in 1971, when she became president of Ala. Maltez de Callejas was one of the most influential feminists of her era.

In 1957, the first year women were allowed to vote in Nicaragua, Maltez de Callejas, Núñez, Mirna Hueck de Matamoros became the first women candidates to run for public office. Núñez was elected as a Deputy to the National Assembly and the other two women were elected as alternates. During the Somoza regime, Ala became aligned in a power arrangement with Somoza, whereby women were increasingly given political office in exchange for their support of his regime. Between 1963 and 1967, Maltez de Callejas served in the Chamber of Deputies. She was appointed Vice-Minister of Education in 1967 and the following year was appointed as Minister of Education. Between 1972 and 1974, she was a delegate to the Constituent National Assembly and then served again in the Chamber of Deputies from 1974 to 1979.

When the Sandinista National Liberation Front, overthrew the government of Anastasio Somoza DeBayle, Maltez de Callejas went into exile for a lengthy period of time. She returned to Managua in 2001 and was involved in organizing the Alliance of Pan American Round Tables, continuing her involvement in the organization through 2013.
