= Matilde Carranza =

Francisca Matilde Carranza Volío, better known as Matilde Carranza was a Costa Rican activist and teacher. She was the first Costa Rican woman to receive a doctorate in philosophy.

== Life ==
Matilde Carranza was born on January 6, 1892, in San José, Costa Rica and baptized on 7 February 1892. Her parents were Francisco Carranza and Petronila Volío.

She was one of the leaders of the teacher's strike of 1919 against the labor policies of President Federico Tinoco Granados, which culminated in setting fire to the government newspaper office, La Información. The strike, led by Ángela Acuña Braun included teachers like Ana Rosa Chacón, Lilia González, Carmen Lyra, Victoria Madrigal, Vitalia Madrigal, Esther De Mezerville, María Ortiz, Teodora Ortiz, Ester Silva and Andrea Venegas.

In 1920, she went with Lyra and González to Europe to learn the Montessori education model so that it could be implemented in Costa Rica.

From the early 1930s, Carranza was furthering her studies in the United States, and continued for almost a decade graduating with a doctorate in philosophy from the University of Wisconsin in 1940. Her graduate thesis, El pueblo visto a través de los Episodios nacionales was published in Costa Rica in 1942. After graduation, she began teaching at Saint Mary-of-the-Woods, Indiana.
