= Ana Rosa Chacón =

Costa Rican activist and educator (1889–1985)

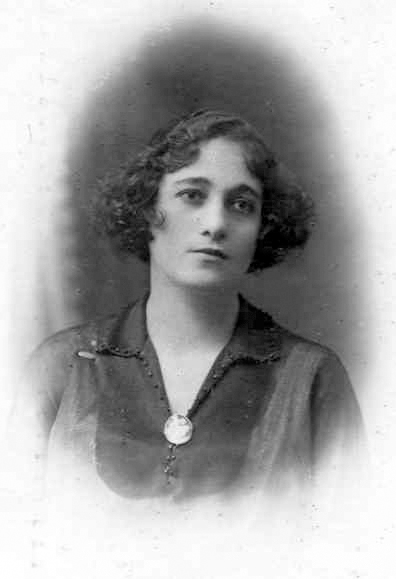

Deputy of the Legislative Assembly of Costa Rica
- In office 1 November 1953 – 30 April 1958
- Preceded by: Fernando Lara Bustamante
- Succeeded by: Marta Saborío Fonseca
- Constituency: San José (7th Office)

Personal details
- Born: Ana Rosa Chacón González; 1889 San José, Costa Rica
- Died: 28 March 1985 (aged 95–96) San José, Costa Rica
- Occupation: health education practitioner, feminist, suffragette, politician

Ana Rosa Chacón (1889 – 28 March 1985) was a Costa Rican educator, health education practitioner, feminist and suffragette. In 1953, in the first election held after women became enfranchised in Costa Rica, Chacón became one of the first three women elected to serve in public office.

== Biography ==
Ana Rosa Chacón González was born in 1889 in San José, Costa Rica. She attended the Colegio Superior de Señoritas, earning a degree in education and physical education by 1907. She studied and implemented programs which aimed at increasing health of children through rhythmic movement, including dance, and body development. In 1913, she helped found the program "La Gota de Leche" (A drop of milk) with Ángela Acuña Braun, Marian Le Cappellain and Sara Casal, which aimed at providing milk to disadvantaged children as well as educating their mothers in proper nutrition and encouraging breastfeeding.

In 1919, Chacón participated in a teacher's strike led by Acuña against the administration of President Federico Tinoco Granados for labor law violations, along with Matilde Carranza, Lilia González, Carmen Lyra, Victoria Madrigal, Vitalia Madrigal, Esther De Mezerville, María Ortiz, Teodora Ortiz, Ester Silva and Andrea Venegas. The main issue for teachers was that their salaries were low and that was compounded because they were paid only in vouchers, which were often depreciated and redeemed at half their value. During the protest, La Información's office, the official government newspaper, was burned down by the teachers. Many of these same teachers, joined together in 1923 at the call of Mexican feminist Elena Arizmendi Mejia. She was living in New York, publishing a magazine Feminismo Internacional (International Feminism), and invited women all over the world to create subsidiaries of the International League of Iberian and Latin American Women on 12 October of that year. As a result, Chacón and others founded the Liga Feminista Costarricense (LFC), first feminist organization in Costa Rica, of which she became the secretary.

In 1925, the Liga presented their demand for the recognition of political and civil rights for women, urging that without the protection of the law they were disadvantaged both socially and economically. In 1931, the organization was back before the Legislature urging that women be given the vote, and again in 1934, the group organized meeting with Congress. They called together a commission focusing on various professional evaluations including legal, sociological, educational, literary and health aspects. The goal was to present a comprehensive overview for the legislature to see how women's lives were impacted. Chacón was part of the education committee and though the legislators agreed that the women's concerns were legitimate, they took no action. Chacón and other feminists continued to push for their right to vote, meeting with every subsequent Congress—1939, 1941, 1944, 1947—until finally, after the Costa Rican Civil War, enfranchisement was granted in 1948.

In 1940, Chacón participated along with Acuña, Virginia Albertazzi, Guillermina Bello, Lidia Fernández and Esther Lina Salazar in the creation of the Costa Rican branch of the Pan American Round Table and an American School. The goal was to obtain scholarships for deserving students, create teacher exchanges, build libraries, and offer education to domestic workers. In 1943, when President Rafael Calderón Guardia attempted to change the election laws to manipulate the vote, Chacón was one of the leaders of the protest and spoke not only about the reform but the need for suffrage. In the 1948 revolution, she also participated in public demonstrations, and participated in both journalistic writings and radio broadcasts urging recognition of the civic value of women's contributions.

Chacón was one of the first three delegates to win a seat in the Costa Rican legislature. In 1953, the first election in which women were allowed to vote, Chacón, María Teresa Obregón and Estela Quesada, each won a seat. She served from 1 November 1953 to 30 April 1958.

She died on 21 March 1985.
