= Kevin Kornegay =

Electrical engineer and professor

Kevin Kornegay is an electrical engineer and professor known for his contributions in the field of computer engineering.

== Early life and education ==
Kornegay was born on March 24, 1959, in Brooklyn, New York, to Dorothy and Thomas Kornegay.

In 1985, he earned his B.S. in electrical engineering from Pratt Institute. Kornegay interned at AT&T Bell Laboratories during his time at Pratt Institute, before attending UC Berkeley for his graduate studies. Afterwards, he earned from the University of California, Berkeley, his M.S. in electrical engineering and computer science in 1990, and his Ph.D. in electrical engineering and computer science in 1992.

== Career ==
Kornegay worked as a researcher from 1992 to 1994 for the IBM Thomas J. Watson Research Center. Kornegay held faculty positions at Purdue University, MIT, Cornell, and Georgia Institute of Technology. In 1994, he started as assistant professor at Purdue University's School of Electrical and Computer Engineering. Later in 1997, he was the Dr. Martine Luther King Jr. Visiting Professor at the Massachusetts Institute of Technology. From 1998 to 2005, he held the positions of associate professor and assistant professor at Cornell University. In 2006, Kornegay joined the faculty of Georgia Institute of Technology as the Motorola Foundation Professor in the Department of Electrical and Computer Engineering.

In 2016, Kornegay was presented with the Endowed Chair in Internet of Things Security at Morgan State University, the first established endowed chair at the university.

In 2023, Kornegay was one of 502 scientists and engineers to be elected as an American Association for the Advancement of Science (AAAS) Fellow in the Section on Industrial Science and Technology.

Currently, Kornegay is a professor at Morgan State University as the Eugene Deloatch IoT Security Endowed Professor and Director of the Cybersecurity Assurance and Policy (CAP) Center for Academic Excellence in the Electrical and Computer Engineering Department.

== Contributions and awards ==
Kornegay worked on computer chips and systems for high-speed data transmission. He received six U.S. patents between 1998 and 2009. Kornegay was named Black Engineer of the Year by U.S. Black Engineer Magazine in 2002. He was also recognized as one of the 50 Most Important Blacks in Research Science by the editors of Science Spectrum and U.S. Black Engineer & Information Technology in 2004. He received the Golden Torch Award for Educator of the Year from the National Society of Black Engineers in 2005.

== Personal life ==
Kornegay has two sons, Kevin Jr. and Justin. He currently resides in Georgia.
