= Lilia González =

Costa Rican educator and activist

Lilia González González (1891–1973) was a Costa Rican educator, and activist.

== Biography ==
She graduated from the Teacher's Training School in 1907 and began teaching at the Escuela Párvulos directed by Anatolia Zamora de Obregón. She also taught at the Escuela Superior de Niñas No. 4 and the Escuela Graduada, both of which were under the direction of Esther Silva. Beginning in 1912, she worked with Carmen Lyra on a children's magazine called "San Selerín" that they published for several years. She was active in the movement against the labor policies of President Federico Tinoco Granados, which culminated in a 1919 teacher's strike and the teachers setting fire to the government newspaper office, La Información. The strike, led by Ángela Acuña Braun included teachers like Gonzáles and Ana Rosa Chacón, Matilde Carranza, Carmen Lyra, Victoria Madrigal, Vitalia Madrigal, Esther De Mezerville, María Ortiz, Teodora Ortiz, Ester Silva and Andrea Venegas.

After Tinoco's ouster, new president Julio Acosta García, had begun concessions with teachers and appointed a new Secretary of Education to make changes. One of those changes was that Gonzáles, Lyra and two other teachers were sent to Europe to study European schooling methods. When they returned, in 1926 the first Montessori preschool was opened. González helped to implement the new uniform educational policies which for the first time were being implemented through the country using a scientific basis. She became director of the Escuela Julia Lang and was a member of the School Inspector's team for the province of San José. In 1928, she began teaching in the Practical School of the Teacher's Normal School and later helped Esther Silva found schools and canteens for workers. In 1945, after the University of Costa Rica was founded, she taught classes there and was later named an honorary professor. In 1959, she was promoted to Dean of the Faculty of Education and retired in 1960.
