= Ala Femenina del Partido Liberal Nacionalista =

Ala Femenina del Partido Liberal Nacionalista, or only Ala Femenina Liberal, was a women's organization in Nicaragua, founded in 1955. It was officially the women's wing of the Partido Liberal Nacionalista (PLN). After having secured women's suffrage in Nicaragua in 1955, the PLN party won the support of the Nicaraguan women's movement, who agreed to become incorporated in the PLN via the women's wing in exchange for state feminism during the Somoza regime (1936–1979).

== History ==
In Nicaragua, the PLN made an alliance with the Nicaraguan women's movement (mainly composed by the Nicaraguan branch of the Liga Internacional de Mujeres Ibéricas e Hispanoamericanas). In 1916, the party made a promise to the suffrage movement to introduce women's suffrage in Nicaragua once the PLN won power.

When the PLN won power in 1936, they did not immediately fulfill their promise. In 1939, Josefa Toledo, chair of the Liga Internacional de Mujeres Ibéricas e Hispanoamericanas, asked for the PLN to support women's suffrage.

In 1950, the PLN finally accepted the suffrage reform, and implemented it in 1955. When women's suffrage was finally introduced in Nicaragua by the PLN Somoza regime. After the fulfillment of the promise, the Nicaraguan women's movement merged with the PLN in the form of the Ala Femenina del Partido Liberal Nacionalista, which became a women's wing of the PLN. All the women's organizations in Nicaragua was incorporated in to the Ala Femenina under the leadership of Olga Nunez de Saballos, and the Nicaraguan women's movement became the loyal ally of the PLN in exchange for a party policy of state feminism.

The PLN Somoza regime did have a liberal and progressive policy on women's rights. However, in practice this only benefitted the new generation of professional upper and middle-class women.
