= Mount St. Mary Academy (New Jersey) =

High school in Watchung, New Jersey, US

Mount Saint Mary Academy
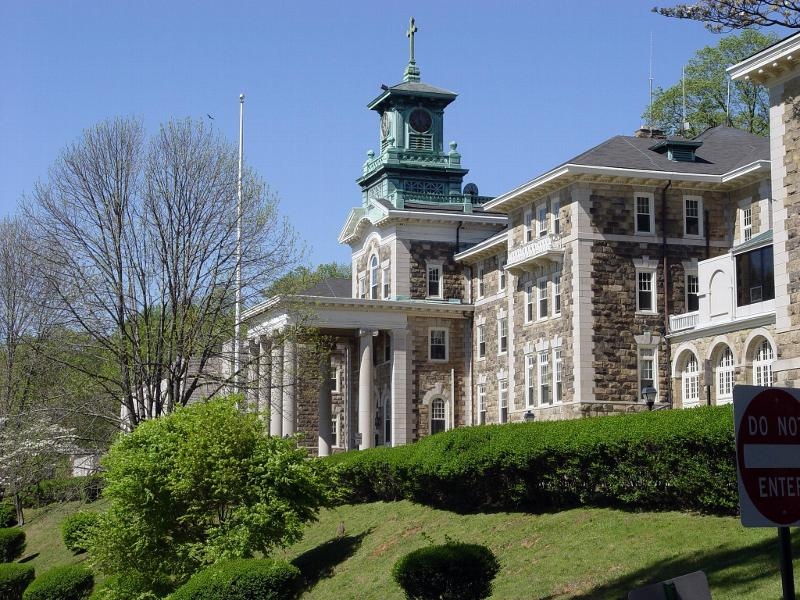

Location
- 1645 U.S. Route 22; Watchung, (Somerset County), New Jersey 07069; United States; 40°38′53.6″N 74°24′54.6″W

Information
- Type: Private, All-Girls
- Religious affiliations: Roman Catholic, Sisters of Mercy
- Established: 1908
- NCES School ID: 00867163
- Directress: S. Lisa D. Gambacorto
- Faculty: 35 FTEs
- Grades: 9–12
- Enrollment: 298 (as of 2019–20)
- Student to teacher ratio: 8.5:1
- Campus size: 80 acres (320,000 m^{2})
- Colors: Blue, gold, and red
- Slogan: Successful Journeys Begin Here
- Athletics conference: Skyland Conference
- Mascot: Lion
- Team name: Mount Lions
- Accreditation: Middle States Association of Colleges and Schools, National Association of Independent Schools, New Jersey Association of Independent Schools
- Publication: Echoes (literary magazine)
- Newspaper: Peeks
- Yearbook: Chimes
- School fees: $3,625 (2023-24)
- Tuition: $28,700 (2023-24)
- Website: www.mountsaintmary.org

Mount Saint Mary Academy is a four-year private high school for girls, located in Watchung, in Somerset County, in the U.S. state of New Jersey. Located in the Roman Catholic Diocese of Metuchen, the school operates financially independent of the Diocese.

As of the 2019–20 school year, the school had an enrollment of 298 students and 35 classroom teachers (on an FTE basis), for a student–teacher ratio of 8.5:1. The school's student body was 70.1% (209) White, 11.1% (33) Hispanic, 8.4% (25) Asian, 5.7% (17) Black, 4.0% (12) two or more races and 0.7% (2) Native Hawaiian / Pacific Islander.

Mount Saint Mary Academy has been accredited by the Middle States Association of Colleges and Schools Commission on Elementary and Secondary Schools since 1937; The school's accreditation status was extended for ten years in Fall 2018. The school holds membership in the National Association of Independent Schools, the New Jersey Association of Independent Schools, the National Catholic Educational Association, the National Coalition of Girls' Schools, the College Board and the Educational Records Bureau.

== History ==
The Academy was founded in 1908 by the Sisters of Mercy of New Jersey and opened with 77 students in elementary school through college. A fire destroyed the main building in 1911, but the school reopened in the following year and has grown steadily. A college division that had been part of the school when it was established was relocated to Lakewood Township, New Jersey in 1924 and became Georgian Court University. In the 1980s and 1990s it was a boarding school that housed local, out of state and international students.

== Campus ==
The campus is situated on a ridge of the Watchung Mountains, overlooking surrounding suburban towns and the skyline of New York City, which is 23 miles (37 km) to the east.

The school, a sponsored work of the Sisters of Mercy, is a nonprofit organization governed by a board of trustees. Its alumnae association, composed of about 4,100 graduates, provides support for a number of school functions. The school's physical plant is owned by the Sisters of Mercy of New Jersey.

== Awards, recognition and rankings ==
In 1984, Sister Mary Eloise Claire Kays became Directress of Mount Saint Mary Academy. Under the direction of Sister Mary Eloise Claire, the Academy enjoyed national recognition as an "Exemplary Private School" a designation bestowed on it by the US Department of Education. During the 1984–85 school year, Mount St. Mary Academy was awarded the Blue Ribbon School Award of Excellence by the United States Department of Education, the highest award an American school can receive.

In 1984–85, Mount Saint Mary Academy was one of 65 private schools in the United States to receive the Council for American Private Education's Exemplary Private School Recognition Project award.

Since 2011, the Academy's literary magazine, Echoes, has earned national awards in NCTE's Literary Magazine Competition.

== Athletics ==
The Mount St. Mary Academy Mount Lions compete in the Skyland Conference, which is comprised of public and private high schools spanning Hunterdon, Somerset and Warren counties in northern New Jersey, operating under the jurisdiction of the New Jersey State Interscholastic Athletic Association (NJSIAA). Prior to the NJSIAA's 2009 realignment, the school had participated in the Mountain Valley Conference, which included public and private high schools in Essex County, Somerset County and Union County. With 528 students in grades 10–12, the school was classified by the NJSIAA for the 2019–20 school year as Non-Public A for most athletic competition purposes, which included schools with an enrollment of 381 to 1,454 students in that grade range (equivalent to Group II for public schools).

The swimming team won the Non-Public Group B state championship in 2003, 2004, 2007-2009 and 2011, and won the Non-Public A title in 2005 (as co-champion with Immaculate Heart Academy) and 2006. The program's seven state titles are tied for fourth-most in the state. The swim team won the Non Public B state championship in 2007 with a 116–54 win vs. Pingry School. In the 2013 finals at The College of New Jersey, the team defeated defending champion Mount Saint Dominic Academy 95–75 to win the Non-Public B title. In 2020 and 2022, the team became the Raritan Division Skyland Conference Champions while also going on to become the NJSIAA A Division Champions and the NJSIAA Non-public “A” State Champions for the 2022 season.

The cross country team won the Non-Public B state championship in 2002, 2003 and 2012.

== Notable alumnae ==
- Angelou Ezeilo (born 1970 as Angelou Chiles, class of 1988), social entrepreneur and environmental activist
- Kim Komando (born 1967, class of 1981), host of radio shows about consumer technology
- Corina Rodríguez López (1895–1982), Costa Rican educator, writer, feminist and occasional sculptor
- Janeen Uzzell, technology executive who is CEO of the National Society of Black Engineers and former COO of the Wikimedia Foundation
