= Marian Le Cappellain =

British teacher

- Born: 1851; Jersey, Channel Islands
- Died: 1923 (aged 71–72); Paris, France
- Occupation: academic
- Years active: 1870–1908
- Known for: First director of Colegio Superior de Señoritas

Marian Le Cappellain (1851–1923) was a British teacher who established one of the first secondary schools available for girls' education in Costa Rica.

== Biography ==
Marian Le Cappellain was born in 1851 in Jersey. She studied in Guernsey and then went to England and studied the classics at York. In 1872, she and her sister, Ada, came to Costa Rica to work as governesses in the employ of the doctor José María Montealegre, after having left a similar post for Rafael Zaldívar, a Salvadoran politician who would later become president of El Salvador.

The sisters founded a private school and gave English lessons to families in San José until 1886, when Marian returned to Europe. Ada, having married Mauro Fernández Acuña, stayed behind. When Fernandez was appointed Minister of Education, he hired Marian in 1888 to work for the state and direct the new Colegio Superior de Señoritas. She returned and began work organizing the institution, including hiring teachers, designing classes, and even teaching both English and science courses. She designed an organization which was open to all social classes, races and religions and later added a kindergarten annex to the secondary school.

In 1913, she helped found the program "La Gota de Leche" (A drop of milk) with Ángela Acuña Braun, Ana Rosa Chacón and Sara Casal, which aimed at providing milk to disadvantaged children as well as educating their mothers in proper nutrition and encouraging breastfeeding. After 20 years of running the school, Cappellain left in 1908 due to ill health and returned to Europe. She died in Paris, France, in 1923. Her remains were returned to Costa Rica and a monument was established to her memory at the Cementerio General de San Jose.
