= Victoria Madrigal =

Victoria Madrigal Araya was a Costa Rican teacher and suffragette. She was the daughter of José Madrigal and Rosa Araya. Her sister, Vitalia Madrigal (died 21 April 1927), was also a teacher and suffragette. In 1919, Madrigal participated in a teacher's strike led by Ángela Acuña Braun against the administration of President Federico Tinoco Granados for labor law violations. Others who participated were Matilde Carranza, Ana Rosa Chacón, Lilia González, Carmen Lyra, Vitalia Madrigal, Esther De Mezerville, María Ortiz, Teodora Ortiz, Ester Silva and Andrea Venegas. The main issue for teachers was that their salaries were low and that was compounded because they were paid only in vouchers, which were often depreciated and redeemed at half their value. During the protest, the office of La Información, the official government newspaper, was burned down by the teachers.

In the 1920s Madrigal, who was teaching at a school which bore her name, married René Charles Van Huffel (29 January 1900 Brussels, Belgium—after 1970), an academic and French instructor. They had one child, a daughter, Fanny Huguett Victoria Van Huffel Madrigal in Alajuela, Costa Rica in 1926. Madrigal died in 1929 in Alajuela, the same year her husband secured his naturalization.
