= Sisters of Mercy (disambiguation) =

Sisters of Mercy is a religious institute established in Ireland.

Sisters of Mercy may also refer to:

== Religious congregations ==
- Sisters of Mercy of New Jersey, United States
- Sisters of Mercy of St. Borromeo, France
- Sisters of Mercy of Verona, Italy
- Community of St John Baptist, also known as the Sisters of Mercy, is an Anglican order of Augustinian nuns

== Music ==
- The Sisters of Mercy, a British gothic rock band
- "Sisters of Mercy", a song by Leonard Cohen on the album Songs of Leonard Cohen
- "Sister of Mercy" (song), a 1984 song by the Thompson Twins
- "Sisters of Mercy", a song by Grand Slam on the album Grand Slam: Live 1984
- "Sisters of Mercy", a song by Cher on the album not.com.mercial

== Film and television ==
- Sister of Mercy (film), a 1929 French silent film
- "Sisters of Mercy" (Law & Order), a 1992 television episode
- "Sister of Mercy" (The Royal), a 2003 television episode

== See also ==
- Sisters of Our Lady of Mercy (disambiguation)
