= Ángela Acuña Braun =

Costa Rican lawyer, writer and feminist

- Born: Ángela Adela Acuña Braun; 2 October 1888; Cartago, Costa Rica
- Died: 10 October 1983 (aged 95); San José, Costa Rica
- Other name: Ángela Acuña de Chacón
- Occupations: lawyer, writer, diplomat
- Years active: 1917–1954

Ángela Acuña Braun, also known as Ángela Acuña de Chacón, (2 October 1888 – 10 October 1983), a Costa Rican lawyer, women's rights pioneer and ambassador, was the first woman to graduate as a lawyer in Central America. Orphaned at the age of 12, she was raised by her maternal aunt and uncle, attending elementary school and beginning high school in Costa Rica. She continued her education in France and England, gaining exposure to the ideas of women's rights. Returning to Costa Rica in 1912, she published articles in support of women's equality. She attended the boys' lyceum or high school where she passed the bachillerato, a prerequisite for entering law school. She embarked on law studies in 1913, leading to a bachelor's degree in 1916. As women were barred from entering the profession, Acuña immediately presented a reform to the civil code allowing this, which was adopted.

Agitating for women's suffrage, Acuña pressed lawmakers to enfranchise women, but for many years was unsuccessful in her demands. After a two-year stay in the United States, where she attended conferences in support of women's rights, she returned to Costa Rica in 1923 and founded the Liga Feminista Costarricense (Costa Rican Feminist League), while resuming her law studies. In 1925, she earned her licenciatura degree with honors, becoming the first woman lawyer not only in Costa Rica but in the whole of Central America. Between 1926 and 1928, she studied aviculture in Brussels and then returned to Costa Rica, where she married. Her law practice focused on the rights of retired teachers, but her primary concern was to press for progress on women's rights and for revisions to the civil code for the protection of children. Acuña founded the Association of University Women of Costa Rica and the Costa Rican chapters of the Pan American Round Table, the Unión de Mujeres Americanas and the Women's International League for Peace and Freedom.

In her later diplomatic career, Acuña was the Costa Rican delegate to the Inter-American Commission of Women from 1941 to 1954. In 1958, she was appointed as the first woman ambassador to the Organization of American States (OAS), where she served for two years, before becoming one of the inaugural members of the Inter-American Commission on Human Rights (IACHR), remaining on the commission through 1972. Her legal specialty was in international human rights law, including the protection of women and children. She made numerous studies of the law and its implications for women and juveniles. Most of her writings were on legal issues, but she worked for two decades on an encyclopedia of Costa Rican women and founded two feminist journals. She was honored with the Benemérita de la Patria (Meritorious Service to the Homeland) in 1982 for her service to the country.

== Early life ==
Ángela Adela Acuña Braun was born on 2 October 1888 in Cartago to Adela Braun Bonilla and Ramón Acuña Corrales. Her mother's father, Juan Braun Rôsler, was of German descent. After her father died in 1894 and her mother's death six years later, Acuña was cared for by her aunt, Rafaela Braun Bonilla, and uncle, General Rafael Villegas Arango. She attended elementary school at Escuela Superior de Niñas Nº2 (Girls' School Nº 2), now Escuela Julia Lang, and then between 1901 and 1905 studied at the Colegio Superior de Señoritas (girls' high school). In 1906, Acuña earned a scholarship to study in Paris at the Institution de jeunes filles Morel de Fos (Morel de Fos Girls' school), which catered to foreign students between 1890 and 1920. She lived in France, and later in Belgium, with the Plenipotentiary Minister of Costa Rica, Marquis Manuel María de Peralta and his wife, Countess Josephine-Jehanne de Clérembault de Soer, a Belgian aristocrat. Between 1909 and 1910, she studied at the Priory Institute in London and learned about Europe's suffrage movement.

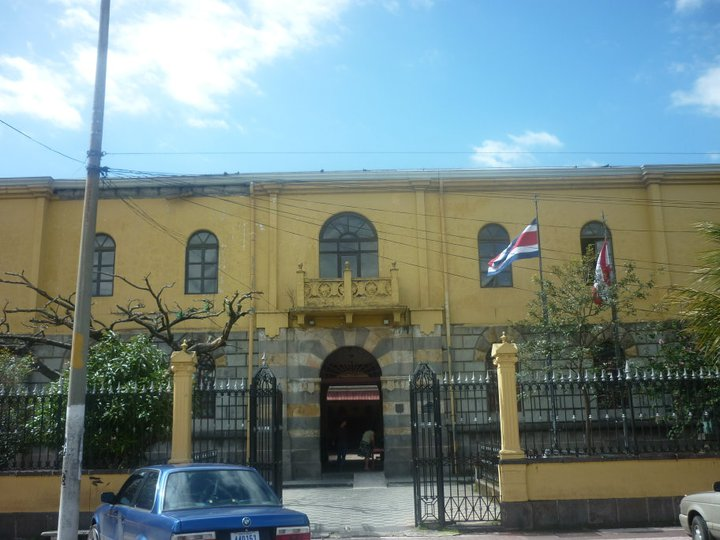
The lyceum, where Acuna studied between 1912 and 1913, pictured in 2010

Acuña returned to Costa Rica in 1912 to further her education but was unable to study law, because the Colegio did not offer the bachillerato qualification, a prerequisite for entering law school. With the help of her uncle General Villegas, and Roberto Brenes Mesén, who later became Minister of Education, she enrolled in the Liceo de Costa Rica (Costa Rica Lyceum), as the only female student, with the goal of matriculating in the humanities. She began publishing articles in magazines and newspapers, sometimes using a pseudonym, agitating for women's equality. By the end of 1912, she became the first woman in the lyceum to obtain the baccalaureat, enabling her to begin law studies in 1913. As there was no university, the courses of the law school and the final examination required for graduation were given by the Costa Rican Bar Association. During her studies, in 1915 she founded the magazine Figaro, inviting writers from throughout the Americas to participate in discussions on women's equality, before graduating in 1916 with a Bachelor of Laws. There were no laws prohibiting women from obtaining a degree in law, but legislation barred them form practicing the profession. As a result, Acuña presented the Costa Rican Congress with a proposal for reforming the civil code, which was signed by the executive on 7 June 1916. The Angelita Acuña Law, as Decree 11 of the Congress became known, allowed women to be legal proxies, serve as procuradores, (Note: There is no English equivalent for this legal representative in the English court system. In cases assigned to a procurador(a), the duties include serving as a liaison for the lawyer, client, and court by filing documents, collecting court orders, and monitoring the case status. They are fully qualified in the law, not the equivalent of a paralegal, but do not defend or represent clients directly, nor are they employed directly by the court. Instead, procuradores facilitate the work of the attorney of record as a court intermediary.) and be witnesses.

== Career ==
=== Women's rights activism (1917–1925) ===
In 1917, Acuña convinced Alejandro Alvarado García, the chief drafter of reforms to the Constitution of Costa Rica enacted that year, to include language allowing limited participation of women in the voting process. The proposal stated that to be eligible, women must be of legal age and respectable; have completed primary school;, have assets of ₡3,000 (colones), or be a widow and mother with four or more children; and be registered in their home canton. The deputies of the constitutional assembly struck the language without seriously considering it, and Acuña was criticized sharply for her radical ideas. When dictator Federico Tinoco Granados was forced to resign in 1919, a proposal was submitted to the Congress by president-elect Julio Acosta García, allowing women who were native or naturalized citizens, and at least 20 years old, to vote in municipal elections and be elected to city councils. Again the proposal was rejected by the Congress. While Acuña supported women's suffrage, educational opportunity, equal pay, and women not paying taxes if they were not allowed to be citizens, she was not a radical or confrontational. She believed that education and rights were necessary for women to fulfill their calling to be mothers of their own children and to contribute to society by elevating the moral fiber of the country. Like many other feminists of her era, she was not focused on the equality of all women, but rather on those of the middle and upper classes.

In 1919, Acuña became the first woman to work for the Ministry of Education, but in 1921, she left for the United States because of health issues. In 1922, she attended the convention of the National League of Women Voters in Baltimore together with Sara Casal de Quirós, as well as the Pan-American Conference of Women in New York, chaired by Carrie Chapman Catt, President of the International Suffrage Alliance. Maud Wood Park, who also participated, stressed the need to organize women throughout the American continent and resulted in the conference delegates creating the Pan American Association for the Advancement of Women, a precursor organization to the Pan American International Women's Committee and Inter-American Commission on Women. After two years, she returned to Costa Rica, where she continued writing and agitating for women's rights, simultaneously resuming her law studies. In 1923, Mexican feminist Elena Arizmendi Mejia, who was living in New York and publishing a magazine Feminismo Internacional (International Feminism), invited women all over the world to create subsidiaries of the International League of Iberian and Latin American Women on 12 October of that year. As a result, Acuña and many of the teachers who had been involved in the 1919 teachers' strike against the dictatorship of Tinoco for labor law violations, founded the Liga Feminista Costarricense (LFC), the first feminist organization in Costa Rica. Acuña was elected president, Esther de Mezerville vice-president and Ana Rosa Chacón secretary. Other teachers who joined in the strike and in the suffrage movement included Matilde Carranza, Lilia González, Carmen Lyra, Victoria Madrigal, Vitalia Madrigal, María Ortiz, Teodora Ortiz, Ester Silva, and Andrea Venegas. When the Ministry of Education proposed increasing only male teachers' salaries in 1924, Acuña mounted a campaign for teachers to receive equal pay, regardless of their sex. She was also involved in the issue of paternity investigation to ensure the inheritance rights and protection of children, regardless of whether they were legitimate or illegitimate offspring.

=== Lawyer and activist (1925–1952) ===
Acuña obtained her licenciatura degree with honors in 1925, becoming the first female trial lawyer (abogado) not only in Costa Rica but in the whole of Central America, after submitting her thesis entitled Los Derechos del Niño dentro de la Ley Moderna (The Rights of the Child under Modern Law). She went to Europe in 1926 to continue her education. In Brussels she studied for three years and earned a diploma in aviculture. Returning to Costa Rica in 1929, she presented her first proposal to the Costa Rican Congress for women's right to vote as well as a reform for the law governing the status of notarios (civil law notaries), allowing women to earn the legal title. She also submitted a request for equal pay for school janitors. After she had rekindled friendship with her former professor, Lucas Raúl Chacón, the two had difficulty in deciding whether they should marry. Acuña was a devout Catholic and Chacón could not have a church marriage as a result of a previous divorce. Though civil marriages were legal, those who were not married in church were socially ostracized. Despite the problems, the two were married on 8 May 1930 and their only child, Isabel Chacón Acuña, was born on 5 July 1931. Acuña opened a law office in her husband's legal firm, located near the offices of La Prensa Libre in San José, where her practice dealt mainly with legal advice to retired teachers.

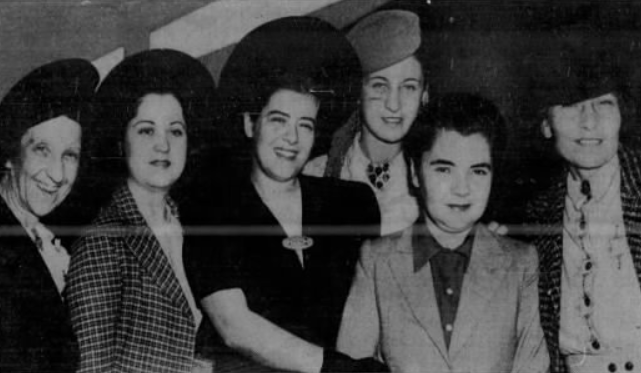
Latin American-US Goodwill Tour "People's Mandate to End War", 1939: (front, l-r) Mable Vernon, Mercedes Guerra (Cuba), Lucia de Paula Fonseco (Brazil), Yvonne Gonzales Rincones (Venezuela), and (rear, l-r) Susana Perez Iroqoyen (Argentina) and Angela Acuna de Chacon (Costa Rica)

Acuña founded and drafted the charter for the Association of University Women of Costa Rica and in 1932, she founded the Costa Rican affiliate of the Women's International League for Peace and Freedom. She continued her agitation for the vote, writing articles in newspapers like Diario de Costa Rica, La Hora, La Nación, and La República and in magazines at home and abroad. In 1934, the Liga Feminista Costarricense called together a commission to meet with legislative delegates. It was made up of educated professional women from the fields of law, sociology, education, fine arts, and health, who sought to convince the legislators that their issues were legitimate. Though the delegates found their concerns well-founded and generally agreed with the principals presented, no action was taken. Between 1938 and 1939, Acuña represented Costa Rica at the Inter-American Commission of Women (Spanish: Comisión Interamericana de Mujeres, CIM), replacing Lidia Fernández, and helped organize the First Central American Women's Congress of Education. With other delegates from Latin America, Acuña toured the United States for six weeks in 1939, as part of the People's Mandate to End War, a committee designed to press for arms control and enforcement of the terms of the Kellogg–Briand Pact. She was the chair of the Costa Rican branch of the commission and wrote about the trip in San José's La Tribuna newspaper.

In 1940, Acuña founded the Costa Rican branch of the Pan American Round Table and in 1941 was appointed Costa Rica's delegate to the Inter-American Commission of Women, a post which she held for the next 13 years. She sought and won in 1941 further changes to Costa Rican legislation, obtaining amendments allowing women to be judges, magistrates, and mayors; but her drive to establish a juvenile court at that time failed. In 1941 and 1942, she took courses at Columbia University to study juvenile justice systems, as she believed that protection for women and children required integrated international solutions. As part of her research, Acuña traveled throughout the United States, attending hearings and trials in Dallas, Denver, New York, Salt Lake City, and Washington, D.C. She also visited juvenile detention and correction centers and vocational rehabilitation centers for children with behavioral problems. In 1943, she attended a meeting of the Panamanian Ministers of Education at their request, to suggest educational reforms. Later that year, she founded the feminist journal Mujer y hogar (Woman and Home). She returned to Costa Rica to press for women's political equality. Between 1943 and 1947, the women of Liga Feminista Costarricense met with every Congress demanding the right to vote.

In 1945, concerned for her daughter's education, Acuña moved to Los Angeles, California. She provided housing to Spanish-speaking students and taught at the University of Southern California for four years. Though she urged her husband to join them in the United States, Chacón, who was suffering from ill health, remained in San José, where he died on 30 November 1948. After conclusion of the Costa Rican Civil War, the new constitution drafted in 1948 proposed the enfranchisement of women. Acuña returned to Costa Rica for the final press for suffrage and was rewarded when on 25 June 1949, women were granted full citizenship and political parity. In 1950, she began collaborating with Blanche Christine Olschak. Acuña wanted to complete a historical social study of Costa Rican Women Through Four Centuries for inclusion in Oschak's Universal Encyclopedia of Women, then the only encyclopedia of women in the world. Acuña's work on Costa Rican women would be published in two volumes between 1969 and 1970 after two decades of work.

=== Diplomacy (1953–1972) ===
The latter part of Acuña's career was spent internationally in diplomatic posts representing Costa Rica. In 1953 she made a comparative study of the laws on women for the Pan American Union (as it was still frequently identified at that time), which was presented at the Caracas Conference of the Inter-American Commission of Women. Between 1955 and 1956, she organized and wrote the governing documents for the Costa Rican chapter of the Unión de Mujeres Americanas (UMA). In 1958, Acuña was appointed as Costa Rica's ambassador to the Organization of American States (OAS), the first time a woman had been appointed to a diplomatic post for the OAS, and was named "Woman of Americas" by the UMA. She served as an OAS ambassador until 1960, when she was selected as one of the inaugural members of the Inter-American Commission on Human Rights (IACHR). Between 1960 and 1972, Acuña was Costa Rica's delegate on the IACHR and traveled throughout the member countries investigating economic, social, and political conditions which impacted human rights. She examined various types of cases, including the 1961 pro-Castro demonstrations against President Joaquín Balaguer; allegations made in 1963 that Cuba had laid a mine field around Presidio Modelo on the Isla de la Juventud to prevent the liberation of political prisoners housed there; and deaths resulting from 100 Hour War between El Salvador and Honduras in 1969.

== Later life, death and legacy ==
After retiring from the IACHR, Acuña remained active and continued attending Inter-American Commission of Women meetings. She also began writing her autobiography, but by the end of the decade was unable to continue as her health declined. On 28 September 1982, she was awarded Costa Rica's "Benemérita de la Patria" (an award for meritorious service to the motherland).

Acuña died on 10 October 1983 in San José, Costa Rica and was buried at the Cementerio Monte Sacro in Curridabat. She is remembered in Costa Rica for her dedication to the fight for women's rights and contributions to human rights. She is recognized as a pioneer who laid the groundwork for the Juvenile Court System, which was formally adopted in 1956, and for laying the foundation for women's citizenship and policies to create a more egalitarian society in Costa Rica. Since 1984, the National Journalism Prize, given to authors who promote the ideals of women's equality in Costa Rica, bears her name and is awarded by the National Institute of Women.

== Selected works ==
- Acuña de Chacón, Angela (1950). "Hacia el matrimonio" [Toward Marriage]. Raza (in Spanish). 8 (48). Medellín, Colombia: 65. OCLC 819831105.
- Acuña de Chacón, Angela (1951). Edad mínima para contraer matrimonio [Minimum age for marriage] (in Spanish). Washington, D.C.: Unión Panamericana. OCLC 894572781.
- Acuña de Chacón, Angela (1962). Los Derechos humanos al alcance de los niños [Human rights at the level of school children] (in Spanish). Washington, D. C.: Unión Panamericana. OCLC 15232475.
- Acuña de Chacón, Angela (1966). El derecho a la vida [The right to life] (in Spanish). Washington, D.C.: Unión Panamericana. OCLC 33191457.
- Acuña de Chacón, Angela (1969–70). La mujer costarricense a través de cuatro siglos [Costa Rican women through four centuries] (in Spanish). Vol. 1–2. San José, Costa Rica: Impr. Nacional. OCLC 903519321.

== See also ==
- First women lawyers around the world
