= La Galería de las Mujeres de Costa Rica =

La Galería de las Mujeres de Costa Rica (The Women's Gallery of Costa Rica) was founded in March 2002 to recognize the contributions of women to the cultural, political and socio-economic development of Costa Rica. The nominations are overseen and the gallery maintained by the Instituto Nacional de la Mujer (INAMU) (National Institute of Women). Of particular focus is the goal of preserving and protecting the history of women who have broken gender stereotypes and advanced human rights principals.

Galería de Mujeres Inductees
| Name | Image | Birth–Death | Year | Area of achievement |
|---|---|---|---|---|
| Rosita Acosta Ramírez | | (born 1940) | 2017 | Worker's rights |
| Amelia Barquero Trejos | | (born 1945) | 2015 | Musician |
| Yadira Calvo Fajardo | | (born 1941) | 2005 | Literature |
| María Isabel Carvajal Castro | | (1887–1949) | 2005 | Literature |
| María Odilia Castro Hidalgo | | (1908–1999) | 2007 | Educator |
| Mercedes Chacón Porras | | (1896–1963) | 2002 | Nursing |
| Felícitas Chaverri Matamoros | | (1886–1934) | 2002 | Pharmacy |
| Adelaida Chaverri Polini | | (1947–2003) | 2003 | Scientist |
| Thelma Curling Rodríguez | | (born 1933) | 2015 | Law |
| Alda Facio | | (born 1948) | 2015 | Law |
| Vitha Lyna Fonseca Saborío | | (1910–1988) | 2005 | Educator |
| Haydee Gómez Cascante | | (1926–2024) | 2002 | Nursing |
| Jacoba González Porras | | (1909–2010) | 2002 | Midwife |
| Violeta Madrigal Mora | | (1920–1996) | 2017 | Lawyer and notary public |
| Ligia Martín Salazar | | (born 1952) | 2008 | Women's rights activist |
| Clotilde Mayorga Mayorga | | (born 1950) | 2002 | Indigenous women's rights activist |
| María Francisca Morales Matamoros | | (1933–2021) | 2002 | Agriculture and midwife |
| Irma Morales Moya | | (1910–1998) | 2002 | Social Worker |
| Carmen Naranjo | | (1928–2012) | 2005 | Literature |
| María Teresa Obregón Zamora | | (1888–1956) | 2002 | Education |
| Elizabeth Odio Benito | | (born 1939) | 2002 | Law |
| Sonia Picado Sotela | | (born 1936) | 2005 | Politics and Human Rights jurist |
| Emilia Prieto Tugores | | (1902–1986) | 2005 | Arts, Women's rights activist |
| Corina Rodríguez López | | (1895–1982) | 2007 | Education, Women's rights activist |
| Anna Gabriela Ross | | (1955–2003) | 2004 | Health |
| Marcelle Taylor Brown | | (born 1933) | 2017 | Educator, community and political leader |
| María Eugenia Vargas Solera | | (born 1922) | 2007 | Law |
| Zarella María Villanueva Monge | | (born 1952) | 2007 | Law |
