= Felícitas Chaverri Matamoros =

Costa Rican pharmacist and poet (1894 – 1934)

María Felícitas Bernabé Chaverri Matamoros
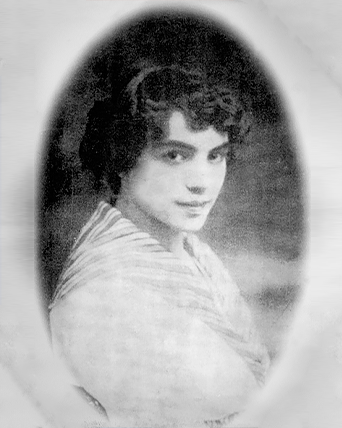
- Born: May 9, 1894; Atenas, Costa Rica
- Died: October 6, 1934 (aged 40); San José, Costa Rica
- Occupations: Pharmacist, poet
- Spouse: Clímaco Pérez Arrieta (married 1921)
- Children: 3
- Honours: La Galería de las Mujeres de Costa Rica (2002)

Felícitas Chaverri Matamoros (9 May 1894 – 6 October 1934) was a Costa Rican pharmacist and poet. In 1917, she became the first woman to obtain a university degree in Costa Rica in the field of pharmacy. She also later became the first woman to head the Department of Drugs and Narcotics of the Ministry of Public Health.

== Biography ==
Born as María Felícitas Bernabé Chaverri Matamoros on 9 May 1894 in Atenas, Alajuela, Costa Rica, Felícitas Chaverri Matamoros was the daughter of Vicente Chaverri Solera and his wife María Teresa Matamoros González. Her family later moved to Heredia, where she completed her school education.

In March 1907, she enrolled in the Liceo de Heredia, where she obtained a bachelor's degree in humanities. This was the first time the Liceo de Heredia held a mixed graduation, that is, where they included women in what had once been an institution exclusive to men. During the year 1910, she wrote a series of poems, including Desdichada and La Esperanza. In March 1912 she was admitted at the School of Pharmacy despite the opposition from some professors on the ground that the regulations did not authorize the entry of women.

Her graduation on 23 November 1917 with a bachelor's degree in pharmacy made her to become the first woman to obtain a university degree in the country in pharmacy. This also paved the way for the entry of other women in higher education in Costa Rica. Following she worked for the advancement of women's rights particularly in the field of higher education.

She married professor Clímaco Pérez Arrieta on 25 December 1921, with whom she had three children.

=== Death and posthumous honors ===
On April 7, 1931, the government named Felícitas as the head of the Department of Drugs and Narcotics of the Ministry of Public Health, making her the first women to hold this position. Two years later, she contracted a lung disease and died in San José on October 6, 1934 at the age of 40 years.

After her death, the Faculty of Pharmacy dedicated the 29th Week of Pharmacy to María Felícitas. On November 15, 1868, the Secretary General of Federación Centroamericana de Mujeres Centroamericanas (Central American Federation of Central American Women) bestowed a posthumous honorary diploma on her in honor of her participation in the recognition of women in higher education and in Costa Rican medicine. To recognize her contribution in the field of pharmacy, in 2002, she was inducted into La Galería de las Mujeres de Costa Rica (the Gallery of Costa Rican Women) at the National Institute of Women (INAMU: Instituto Nacional de las Mujeres).
