= Janeen Uzzell =

American technology executive

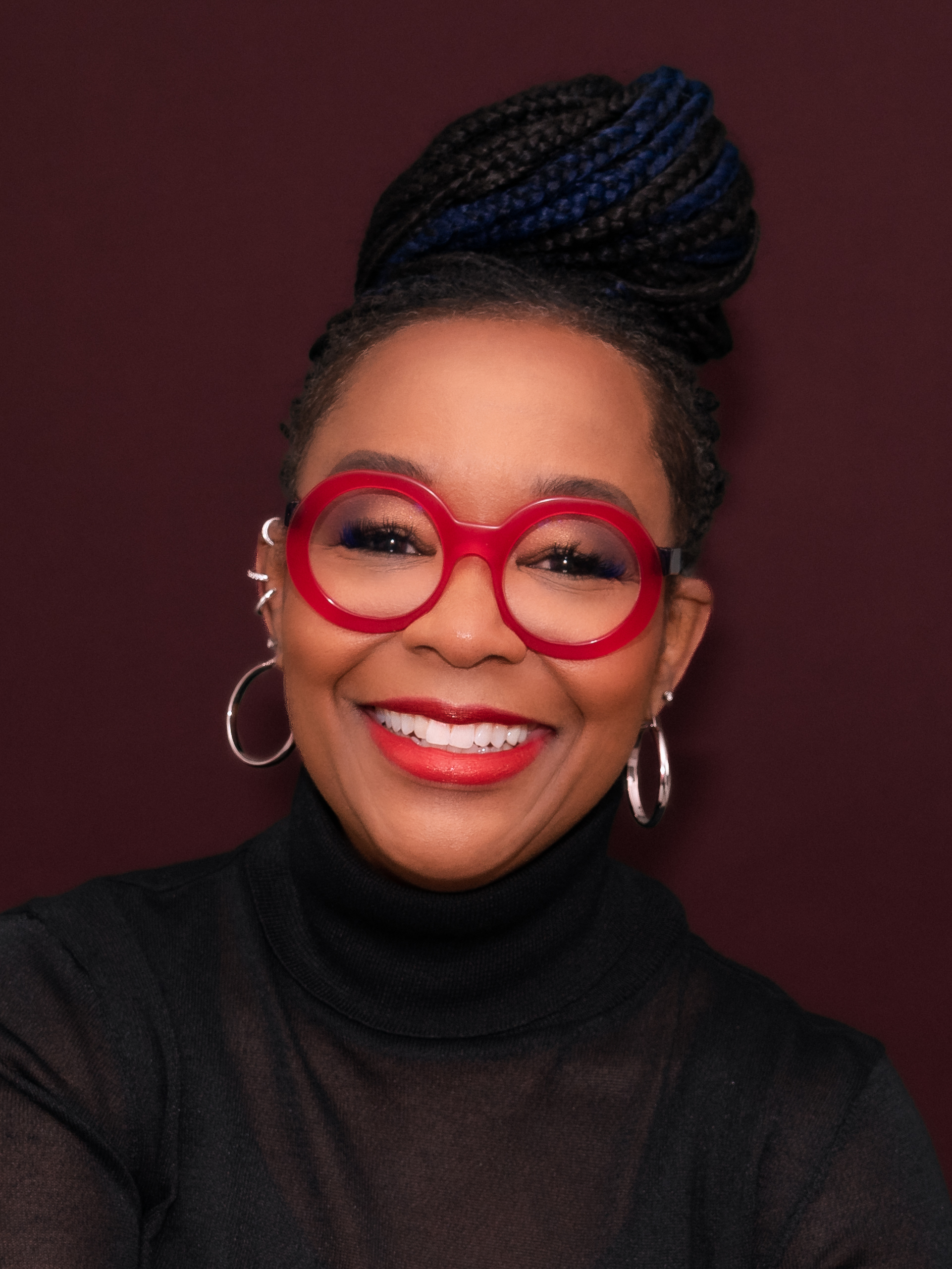
- Born: Newark, New Jersey, U.S.
- Education: North Carolina A&T State University; Fairleigh Dickinson University
- Employer: National Society of Black Engineers
- Parent(s): Jay Uzzell and Kate Uzzell

Janeen Uzzell is an American global technology executive and CEO of the National Society of Black Engineers.

== Early life and education ==
Uzzell was born in Newark, New Jersey, and raised in Plainfield, New Jersey, where she attended Mount St. Mary Academy. She has cited her family as an inspiration for her education and career. Her father, Jay Uzzell, was a musician in the band The Corsairs, and her mother is Kate Uzzell. She earned a bachelor's degree in mechanical engineering from North Carolina A&T State University and an MBA from Fairleigh Dickinson University.

== Career ==
Uzzell joined General Electric in 2002, focusing on healthcare technologies. In 2016, Uzzell took over the Women in Technology programs at General Electric. Here she led the implementation of an ad campaign that showcased women engineers, including Mildred Dresselhaus.

In 2021, after working for the Wikimedia Foundation as COO, Uzzell became CEO of the National Society of Black Engineers.

Uzzell serves on the advisory boards for Mercy Ships and as an advisor to the Believers in Business Collegiate Organization of the InterVarsity Christian Fellowship.

== Honors ==
The Network Journal named Uzzell one of its "40 Under Forty Achievers" in 2005 and one of "25 Most Influential Black Women in Business" in 2016. She has received the General Electric African-American Forum's Icon Leadership Award. In 2025, Uzzellwas elected to the National Academy of Engineering.
