= Sonia Picado Sotela =

Costa Rican jurist, politician and university professor

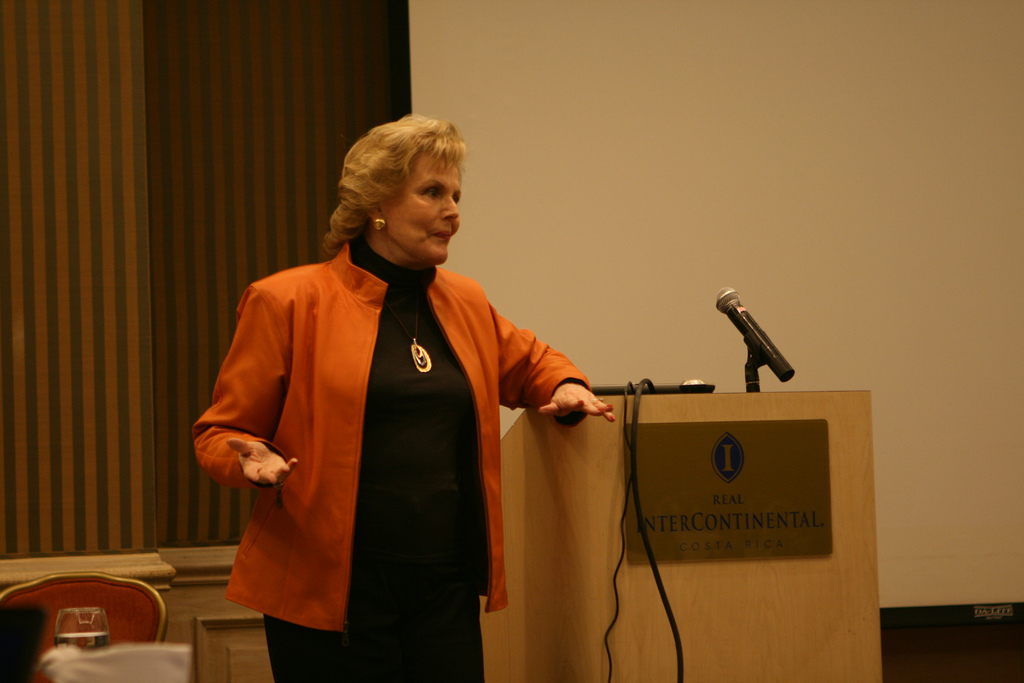
Picado in 2008

Sonia Picado Sotela (born 20 December 1936) is a Costa Rican jurist, politician and university professor with experience in the field of human rights.

== Life ==
Picado was born in San José, Costa Rica. She has held positions in the Inter-American Institute of Human Rights (IIDH), including Internal Director (1983-1984), Assistant Executive Director (1984-1987) and Executive Director (1987-1994).

At present she occupies the Presidency of the IIDH, the first woman to hold this appointment. Previously she formed part of the Inter-American Court of Human Rights, where she was a judge and, from 1988 to 1994, vice-president. Likewise, she is member of the Managerial Council in Human Security of the United Nations, the Permanent Court of Arbitration at The Hague, and of the Inter-American Dialogue.

She has also been ambassador of Costa Rica in the United States between the 1994 to 1998 and Legislator in 1998-2002 for the National Liberation Party. From here she carried out important fights to incorporate the perspective of gender to the distinct law projects and promoted other benefits for Costa Rican women. She was president of the party from 1999 to 2001.

She has a recognized path as defender of human rights, especially in the promotion and fight for improving the human rights for women.

== Publications ==
In addition to numerous articles published at a national and international level, her opinions have been expressed in the following works: “Political Participation of Woman: A challenge yesterday, today and always” (2001), “Woman and Politics” (2002) and “Human Security and Human rights” (2003).

== Awards and honours ==
For her recognized path as defender of human rights, especially in the promotion and fight for improving the human rights of women, she has been credited with three doctorates honoris cause - Elmhurst University, (2000), University of Miami, (2002) and Colby College, (2003) - and to several awards of international organisms such as the United Nations Prize in the Field of Human Rights (1993) and the Prize of the United Nations Development Programme (1995).

At the national level her contributions in the advance of the equality and the rights of women received the following recognitions: Recognition by the Humanitarian and Cultural Efforts (1987), the Federation of Professional Women and of Businesses of Costa Rica, Recognition by the Collaboration in Problems Related with the Women, (1986), of the Inter-American Commission of Women, and Recognition by the Professional Work with the Women, of the Organisation of Citizen Costarricenses (1986).

Likewise, the National Institute of the Women inducted her to La Galería de las Mujeres de Costa Rica (The Women's Gallery of Costa Rica) in 2005.

== See also ==
- Permanent Court of Arbitration, The Hague
- National Liberation Party (Costa Rica)
- United Nations Prize in the Field of Human Rights
- Inter-American Court of Human Rights
- Inter-American Dialogue

Preceded by Edelberto Castiblanco Vargas	Deputy of the Legislative Assembly of Costa Rica (9º place of the province of San José); 1998-2002	Succeeded by Epsy Campbell Barr
