= Emma Catalina Encinas Aguayo =

Pilot, translator, women's rights advocate

- Born: Emma Catalina Francisca Guadalupe Encinas Aguayo; 24 October 1909; Mineral de Dolores, Madera Municipality, Chihuahua, Mexico
- Died: 15 November 1990 (aged 81)
- Other names: Emma E. de Gutiérrez Suárez, Emma Gutiérrez Suárez, Emma G. Suarez
- Occupations: pilot, writer, translator, and women's rights and Pan-American organizer
- Years active: 1931-
- Known for: first licensed Mexican woman pilot

Emma Catalina Encinas Aguayo (also known as Emma Gutiérrez Suárez and Emma G. Suarez (1909-1990) was the first Mexican woman to attain a pilot's license in her country. When she gave up flying, she became an interpreter and translator for several government offices and served the president Luis Echeverría and his family as their official translator. She also interpreted for the United Nations and served as the Director General of the Alliance of Pan American Round Tables for many years. She was the first honoree as Woman of the Year of the Pan American Alliance in 1967.

== Early life ==
Emma Catalina Francisca Guadalupe Encinas Aguayo was born on 24 October 1909 in the village of Mineral de Dolores (es), in the Madera Municipality, of Chihuahua, Mexico. In her childhood, her family fled their native state because of the Mexican Revolution and settled in El Paso, Texas. Encinas attended a private girls' school for seven years and then made her way to Los Angeles, California. She studied at the University of California for a year and then studied dance, participating in stage and screen productions. Encinas was in the cast of at least two films Rio Rita and Romance of the Rio Grande. After two years of study, she returned to Chihuahua.

== Career ==
Encinas founded a dancing school in Chihuahua and began teaching, but she dreamed of learning to fly. A friend introduced her to Roberto Fierro Villalobos, who had created the first aviation school in Mexico. The school was located in Chihuahua and Encinas used her earnings from the dance studio to pay for lessons. Just when she was preparing to solo, Villalobos was recalled to the capital, as at the time, he was serving as the head of the first Air Regiment of the Mexican Air Force. Determined, Encinas followed him to Mexico City, but was unable to be admitted to any of the aviation schools because she was a woman. Finally she approached Villalobos again, who agreed to train Encinas if she could gain the permission of his general, Leobardo C. Ruiz. Ruiz authorized her instruction and Encinas began her training at the Balbuena Base (es). Her mother gave her money for the training, but Encinas paid her own expenses, by translating aviation magazines and giving English lessons to other pilots. She completed her flying examination for her solo flight on 20 November 1932 and received her license soon after. On 4 December 1932, license #54 of Mexico was issued to Encinas as the first woman licensed as a pilot in the country.

Encinas became a protégé of the Mexican Air corps, flying government planes and even the plane of the president. Occasionally she was allowed to co-pilot on Corsair bombers. When she married, Encinas gave up flying and moved with her husband, Dr. Gutiérrez Suárez, who was a physician to Las Choapas, Veracruz. She worked as a piano teacher and ballet instructor for a time. Then the couple moved to Tehuantepec, where she turned her attention to the Alliance of Pan American Round Tables, a women's organization formed in 1916 to promote cooperation between the people in the Western Hemisphere. She joined the organization in the 1940s, became the National Director for the Mexican branch of the alliance in the 1950s and in 1962 was elected as its Director General. When she began her term as president of the Alliance, there were only 58 affiliated organizations, but Gutiérrez Suárez began visiting all of the countries in the region to promote membership. By 1966, she had visited all but two of the countries in the Americas and affiliated organizations had grown to 92 round tables. In 1966 at the annual convention, the Alliance agreed that they would promote a Woman of the Year to recognize women who had upheld the tenets of the organization and served as an example for other members. The inaugural recipient was Gutiérrez Suárez, who was recognized in 1967.

In addition to her work for the Alliance, Gutiérrez Suárez was dedicated to the empowerment of women and worked to gain suffrage in the early 1950s. In 1953, she worked as a television producer in Mexico City, producing educational programs to inform women on issues and their responsibilities as voters. Gutiérrez Suárez wrote articles for many periodicals in Mexico and was featured in both the Reader's Digest and the Saturday Evening Post. In addition to her own writing, she translated around 300 articles, books and novels per year as she was fluent in English, French, Portuguese, Russian and Spanish. She worked in public relations with American Airlines in Mexico and acted as a translator for numerous businesses, as well as the United Nations center in Mexico City. In the 1960s, she served as an interpreter and translator for several government offices, as well as serving the Echeverría family. In the 1970s, she became the official translator for president Luis Echeverría during his term.

== Death and legacy ==
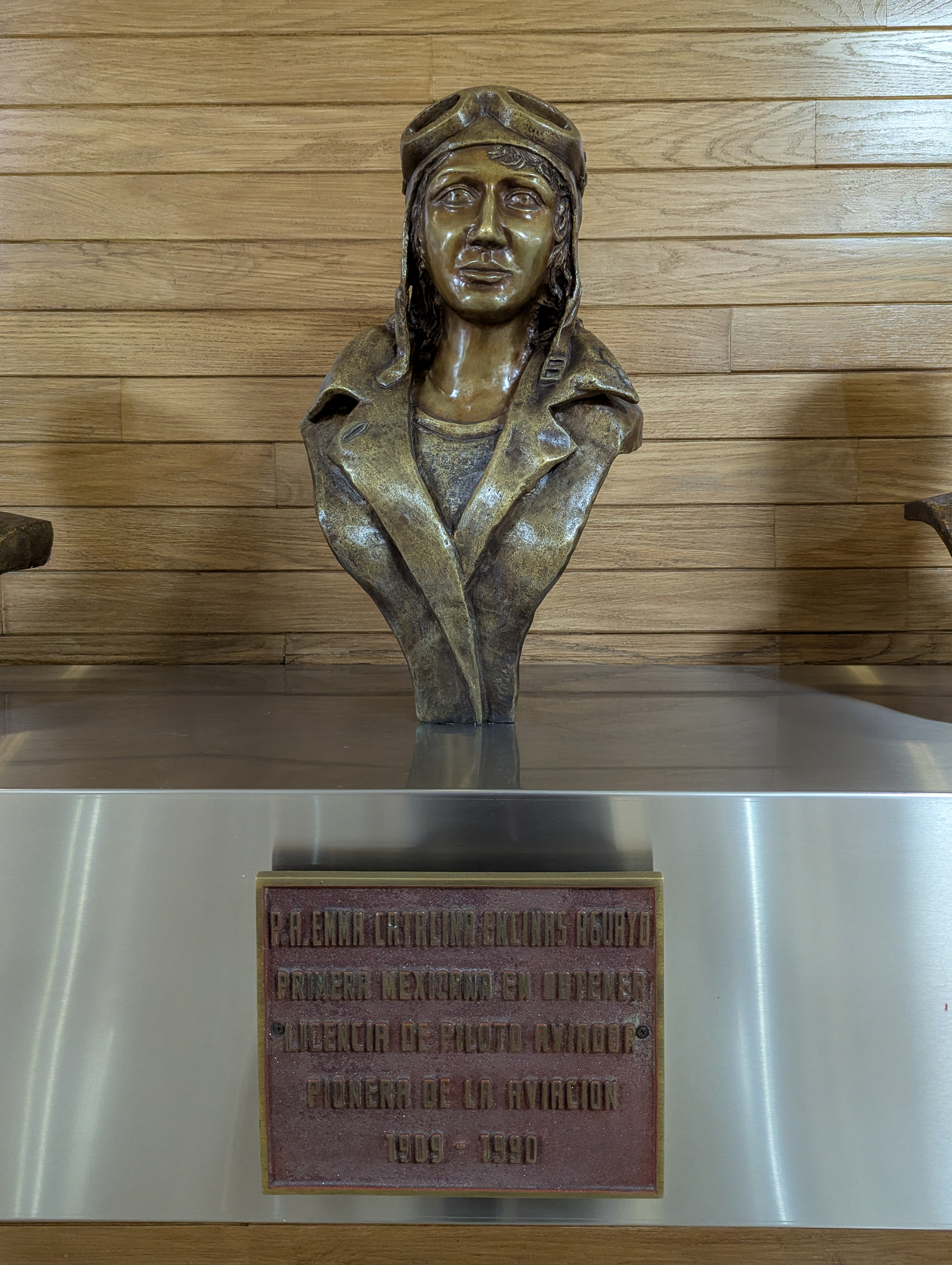
Bust of Emma Encinas Aguayo, Terminal 1 of Mexico City International Airport, Mexico.

Encinas died on 15 November 1990. Two years after her death, a bust paid for by the women of the Pan American Round Table was installed at the Mexico City International Airport in the Gallery of the Heroes of World Aviation. Papers related to her work for the Panamerican Alliance can be found at the University of Texas at Austin in the Nettie Lee Benson Latin American Collection for the Alliance of Pan American Round Tables under the name Emma G. Suarez.
