= Mauro Fernández Acuña =

Government minister of Costa Rica (1843–1905)

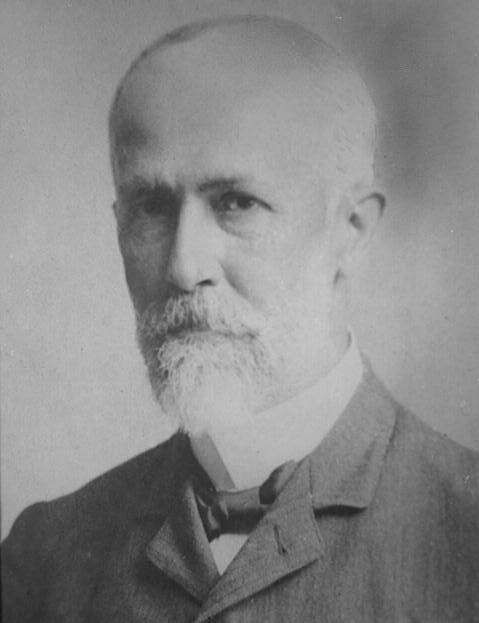

President of the Constitutional Congress
- In office 1 May 1904 – 30 April 1905
- Preceded by: Ricardo Jiménez Oreamuno
- Succeeded by: Federico Tinoco Iglesias

Deputy of the Constitutional Congress
- In office 1 May 1904 – 16 July 1905
- Constituency: San José Province
- In office 1 May 1892 – 31 August 1892
- Constituency: San José Province

Personal details
- Born: Mauro Fernández Acuña; 23 August 1840 San José, Costa Rica
- Died: 16 July 1905 (aged 61) San José, Costa Rica
- Party: Republican

Mauro Fernández Acuña (19 December 1843 – 16 July 1905) was a Costa Rican politician and lawyer.

== Biography ==
He studied law at the University of Santo Tomás, from which he graduated in 1869. He reached several positions in the Supreme Court of Justice of Costa Rica and was university professor of the College of Lawyers. He was a delegate in the Costa Rican Constituent Assembly in 1880 and again in 1885, 1892 and 1902. He was President of the Congress, Minister of Property and Commerce, advisor of State and Director of the National Bank of Costa Rica.

In 1885, he was named by President Bernardo Soto Alfaro as the head of the Secretariat of Public Instruction, where he initiated a reform in Costa Rican education, which triggered the closing of the University of Santo Tomás (at which he studied) and put more funding into Secondary Education. He helped found the Colegio Superior de Senoritas, Costa Rica's first secondary school for women.

Fernández was responsible for hiring his wife Ada's sister, Marian Le Cappellain, to found the Colegio Superior de Señoritas in 1888.

He died in San José on 16 July 1905. He was declared a Benemérito de la Patria, a title given to honorable Costa Rican persons in history, by Executive Decree 109 on 18 June 1955.

== Currency ==
Mauro was placed on the front of the 2,000 colones bank note of Costa Rica. This brilliant blue note is equal to about $3.00 and depicts a coral reef scene on the back.
