= Odilia Castro Hidalgo =

Costa Rican teacher and communist

- Born: María Odilia Castro Hidalgo; 26 October 1908; Santiago de Puriscal, Costa Rica
- Died: 15 April 1999 (aged 90); San José, Costa Rica
- Occupation(s): educator, Women's Rights Advocate, communist
- Years active: 1930–1999
- Notable work: Founded teachers union

María Odilia Castro Hidalgo (1908–1999) was a Costa Rican teacher, communist and feminist. She founded the parent organization which would become the National Association of Educators. Exiled for her communist activities after the Costa Rican Civil War, Castro later returned and founded several social welfare programs. She taught for 32 years and served as a nurse in Costa Rica and Venezuela. Castro was admitted to the Costa Rican National Institute for Women (INAMU)'s Gallery of Women in 2006.

== Biography ==
María Odilia Castro Hidalgo was born on 26 October 1908 in Santiago de Puriscal, Costa Rica. Her parents, who were both teachers, moved while she was young to San José for better educational opportunities. Castro attended the Girls High School, worked with literacy and temperance campaigns, and participated in health seminars and summer camps for children of tubercular families. She wanted to study medicine but the cost for either a doctor or nursing course was beyond her means and she decided upon teaching. Castro enrolled in the Escuela Normal de Heredia, obtained her teaching credentials in 1929, and began teaching at Juan Rafael Mora School. She took night classes in nursing.

Castro was politically active and aligned with leftist policies of the Costa Rican Communist Party. She and fellow teachers María Alfaro de Mata, María Isabel Carvajal, Adela Ferreto, Angela García, Luisa González, Stella Peralta, Emilia Prieto, Lilia Ramos, Esther Silva and Hortensia Zelaya, who had been radicalized at the Normal School (teacher's college), challenged a society built on privilege and the roles of women being confined to home, marriage, and motherhood. In 1939, she attended the First International Congress of Teachers, held in Havana and returning home founded and organization Teachers United, which would later become the National Association of Educators. In the 1940s, she worked in "cultural missions" to help rural citizens access government services. In 1947, Castro represented Costa Rica at the Primer Congreso Interamericano de Mujeres in Guatemala City, which had been organized by the Women's International League for Peace and Freedom to discuss international issues, including women's suffrage.

In 1948, she served as a nurse during the civil war. At the close of the war, José Figueres Ferrer outlawed the communist party and sent its members into exile. Castro was exiled living in both Mexico and Venezuela, where she worked as a nurse and studied social work.

In 1964 she represented Costa Rica in Bogotá, Colombia at the Seminar for Leaders of Social Welfare in Latin America. She also assisted at the Center for Nutrition and Health in San Pedro de Montes de Oca, throughout the 1960s. Castro was the founder and vice president of the Costa Rican Citizen Organization and the Federation of Voluntary Agencies. She also founded the Association of Retired Teachers and served as their representative to the Board of Pensions and Retirements. She served as vice president of the Pro National Children's Trust Association, up until her death.

Castro Hidalgo died on 15 April 1999. In 2006, she was admitted to the Costa Rican National Institute for Women (INAMU)'s Gallery of Notable Women.
