= Florence Terry Griswold =

American cattlewoman and rancher

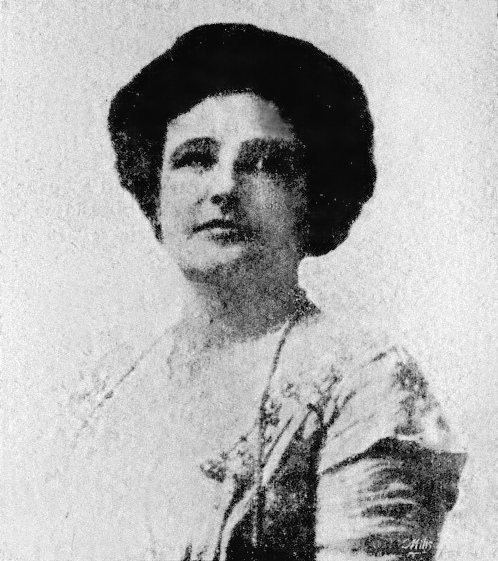
- Florence Brundage, 1910 delegate to the Trans-Mississippi Cattlemen's Convention
- Born: Florence T. Terry; May 28, 1875; Dimmit County, Texas
- Died: July 7, 1941 (aged 66); San Antonio, Texas
- Other names: Florence Terry Shaw
- Occupations: rancher, community worker, suffragist
- Years active: 1908-1941
- Known for: founding the Pan-American Round Tables

Florence Terry Griswold (May 28, 1875 – July 7, 1941) was an American cattlewoman and rancher from Texas. She was the first woman delegate of the Texas Cattle Raisers Association to attend the Trans-Mississippi Convention and for several years, the only woman delegate. A staunch supporter of women's equality, she worked as a suffragist, served as a Republican National Convention Delegate for many years and later fought for equal pay for women. She is most known as the founder of the Pan-American Round Tables in 1916, which has grown from a single club begun in San Antonio, Texas, to an international NGO with over 1400 branches.

== Early life ==
Florence T. Terry was born on May 28, 1875, on La Pendencia, a ranch located between Eagle Pass and Carrizo Springs, Texas to Louisa James (née Lamkin) and Judge William Theodore Terry. Terry's grandfather, Constant Terry, was a prominent settler in south Texas and had urged his son, who had earned a law degree in New York to move west. The young couple settled on the ranch and Theodore worked in nearby Eagle Pass as a lawyer. He became one of the first federal judges in Southwest Texas and built his ranch to an extensive size. Louisa and Theodore had four children: Annie Louise, Alice, William Nathaniel and Florence, the youngest child. From an early age, she was bilingual.

On September 5, 1894, in Carrizo Springs, she married Felix Motlow Shaw, a rancher and cattleman. Felix was well known among fellow ranchers having been one of the two ranchers, who introduced shorthorn bulls to the area. Subsequently, the couple had four children: Ruth, Adele, Hazel and Felix Jr. Initially they made their home in Webb County, Texas. Later, they maintained a home in San Antonio at 323 Woodlawn Avenue as well as maintaining their ranch in Dimmit County. On July 10, 1908, Shaw's husband Felix became overheated and had a stroke, when working on his ranch. He was transported via train to Uvalde and then driven by car to his home in San Antonio. He died a week later on 18 July 1908, leaving the widow and her four children his estate.

== Career ==
Upon Felix's death, Shaw took over his business and operated as a cattlewoman and rancher. Because the life insurance company refused to pay, Shaw sued and was successful in her claim. Managing the ranch, she doubled the holdings her husband had left her and by 1910, had over 100,000 acres with 5,000 head of cattle on her ranches in Webb and Dimmit counties. She also managed a 500-acre farm in Dimmit county. Shaw was one of the 1909 delegates, and the only woman sent by the Texas Cattle Raisers Association to the 1909 Trans-Mississippi Convention in Denver. On 29 September 1910 at her home, Shaw married her second husband Spencer Patterson Brundage, a real estate partner in the firm of Hust and Brundage. (Note: Allen's newspaper account shows the marriage took place on September 29, 1910, but the record shows that was the date the license was issued. The date of the marriage on the license shows September 20th, which precedes the license date. Recordation was October 1, 1910. A newspaper article from The Galveston Daily News shows the couple were married on Thursday evening, confirming the date of September 29th.) The couple immediately left for an extended month long holiday in the east, but were back in Texas in time for her to attend the Trans-Mississippi Convention, where once again, she was the only woman delegate.

After her second marriage, Brundage became more socially active, joining such organizations as the Reading Club and the San Antonio Woman's and Symphony Society. Her husband became vice president of the International Club, to promote the city and provide hospitality to tourists from Mexico. She also joined the women's suffrage movement, attending the State Convention for Equal Franchise in 1913, serving as the corresponding secretary for the San Antonio Equal Suffrage Society, and visiting with Congressmen throughout the state. By the end of 1913, the couple had divorced and Brundage resumed use of the name of Shaw. She married her third husband John Case Griswold, a real estate clerk at A. C. Dauchy Company, on June 8, 1914, and the two settled into her San Antonio home. Her marriage did not stop her campaign for women's rights, as she became a "frequent, featured speaker" on behalf of enfranchisement. She also began to hold informal meetings of women to improve international relationships with Latin American women.

With the end of the Mexican Revolution and the influx of women and children refugees, to whom she opened her home, Griswold formalized the international meetings. Believing that businessmen and politicians pursued self-serving interests, she was convinced that women could help create bridges by familiarizing themselves with other cultures and building networks. To that end, she called together a group of friends at the Menger Hotel on October 16, 1916, to create the Pan American Round Table, for which she served as first Director General. As the organization expanded to several branches in Texas, Griswold established the Pan American Round Tables of Texas in 1922 and became the first Director General of the state organization.

In 1924, Griswold was elected as Republican National Committeewoman for Texas and served for eight years, striving to improve the rights for women. She was particularly in favor of pay equality for men and women performing equal work, as well as unpaid labor for domestic service being included as an essential part of the economy. She remained politically active in the national Republican Party events and served as a chair for the election campaign of Wendell Willkie.

== Death and legacy ==
Griswold died on July 7, 1941, in San Antonio, Texas. The Pan American Round Tables has grown into an international organization with over 1400 branches located in each country of the Western Hemisphere. In 2016, the organization celebrated its centennial with a convention honoring its founder. The Florence Terry Griswold Scholarship is awarded annually by the Alliance of Pan American Round Tables to allow Latin American students to study in the United States.
