= Olga Núñez Abaunza =

Nicaraguan lawyer

- Born: 22 March 1920; Masaya, Nicaragua
- Died: 1971 (aged 50–51); Nicaragua
- Other name: Olga Núñez Abaunza de Saballos
- Occupation: attorney
- Years active: 1938–1977
- Notable work: first female attorney in Nicaragua

Olga Núñez Abaunza (22 March 1920 – 1971) was the first female Nicaraguan lawyer and first female notary. She was the first woman to serve in a Ministerial capacity and the first woman Deputy to serve in the National Assembly of Nicaragua. She was an ardent feminist, attending feminist conferences, forming a feminine wing of the liberal party, and running for office on a feminist platform.

== Biography ==
Olga Núñez Abaunza was born on 22 March 1920 in Masaya, Nicaragua to Arturo Núñez Arteaga and Filomena Abaunza Zúñiga. She went to primary school at the Colegio de Señoritas de Masaya, where she ran the school newspaper. To obtain a secondary education, she began at the all-boys' school, Instituto de Varones de Masaya and concluded her studies at Instituto Nacional Central Ramírez Goyena in Managua. The school was considered the best in the country at that time and she finished in 1938 with high marks.

Though attempts were made to dissuade her from studying law, Núñez enrolled at the Central University of Nicaragua. In 1945, she graduated as the first female attorney from Nicaragua, and first notary; the first male lawyer, Miguel de Larreynaga, graduated in 1801. Her thesis was “La posición de la mujer en la Constitución y el Derecho Penal de Nicaragua”. (The position of women in the constitution and criminal laws of Nicaragua). That year, she won the national literature prize Premio Nacional de Literatura Rubén Darío for her unpublished novel Renunciation. She went on to at the University of Pennsylvania and Johns Hopkins University with a focus on international human rights and completed a Master's at the American University of Washington College of Law.

While she was studying, Núñez was also attending feminist conferences. In 1945, she attended the Chapultepec Conference (the fore-runner to Inter-American Treaty of Reciprocal Assistance) and served as a delegate to the Inter-American Commission of Women (known now as CIM). In 1947, she attended the Primer Congreso Interamericano de Mujeres in Guatemala City, Guatemala, as the representative of CIM.

In 1950, she was named vice-minister of education, the first woman to ever hold the post. She held that post until 1956, when she was elected to the Chamber of Deputies. In 1955, she had founded the Ala Femenina Liberal (Women's Liberal Wing) of Somozas' Nationalist Liberal Party and ran on a feminist platform. In 1957, Núñez and the two alternates also elected—Mirna Hueck de Matamoros and Mary Coco Maltez de Callejas—were the first women candidates to run for office. Núñez was the first woman deputy to serve in the National Assembly of Nicaragua. During her tenure, she introduced many pieces of international legislation and also legislation for various municipalities. In one case, she was able to resolve a long-running dispute between two towns in the Estelí Department, by helping La Trinidad obtain its designation as a city in 1962.

She served until her early death in 1971.

== Private life ==
In 1953, she married fellow attorney, Efrén Saballos and had four daughters.

== See also ==
- First women lawyers around the world
