= Esther de Mézerville =

Guatemalan teacher, feminist, suffragette, and activist (1885–1971)

- Born: Esther de Mézerville Ossaye; 29 April 1885; Guatemala
- Died: 1971; San José, Costa Rica
- Occupations: teacher, rights activist
- Years active: 1907–1950

Esther de Mézerville Ossaye (29 April 1885 - 1971) was a Guatemalan teacher, feminist, suffragette and activist who worked to help women obtain the vote in Costa Rica.

== Biography ==
Esther de Mézerville Ossaye was born in Guatemala on 29 April 1885 to French immigrant father, Émile de Mézerville Coupé and his Canadian-born wife, Noémie Ossaye Millelot. When her father died, Esther's mother immigrated with her children to Costa Rica in 1898. As a young girl, she traveled and was educated in France, Belgium and Switzerland.

In 1907, she returned to Costa Rica and began teaching French in San José, Costa Rica. In 1908, she became the principal of the Escuela Superior de Niñas for seven years and in 1917 was appointed Technical Inspector of Schools for San José. She was active in the 1919 movement against the labor policies of President Federico Tinoco Granados, which culminated in a teacher's strike and the teachers setting fire to La Información, the government newspaper office. The strike, led by Ángela Acuña Braun included teachers like and Matilde Carranza, Ana Rosa Chacón, Lilia González, Carmen Lyra, Victoria Madrigal, Vitalia Madrigal, María Ortiz, Teodora Ortiz, Ester Silva and Andrea Venegas.

After the Tinoco dictatorship was toppled, she was appointed as director, in 1922, of the Colegio Superior de Señoritas and the following year joined with Acuña in founding the Liga Feminista Costarricense (LFC), first feminist organization in Costa Rica. She became the organization's vice president and helped spearhead the long struggle for suffrage in Costa Rica. De Mezerville resigned the post as school director in 1926 and embarked on a European and North African tour including Algeria, French Morocco, France, Italy and Spain. Returning, in 1931, she joined again with Acuña in presenting an amendment to the legislature for granting women the right to vote.

De Mezerville served on the board and committees of numerous organizations. She was involved in the congress to establish retirement funds for teachers in 1934 and a member of the Committee on Archaeology and Pre-Columbian Art that same year. In the 1940s, she worked with the Anti-Nazi National Front and was a delegate to the Inter-American Peace conference held in Chapultepec, Mexico City in 1945. She served as president of both the White Cross and Red Cross organizations of Costa Rica and in 1948 received a Medal of Merit from the Costa Rican branch of the Red Cross. From 1946 to 1950, she served as the vice president on the Board of the Bank for the National Teaching Association. In 1949, she was selected as "Woman of the Year" by the Costa Rican section of the Unión de Mujeres Americanas.

De Mezerville died in 1971 in San José, Costa Rica.
