= Georgina Fletcher =

Colombian politician and suffragist

Georgina Fletcher, was a Spanish suffragist, author, artist and women's rights activist based in Colombia in the early 20th century.

She became the Colombian representative of International League of Iberian and Latin American Women in 1924. She was a pioneer of the Colombian women's movement and a leading figure of the same during the 1920s, 1930s and 1940s.

== Books ==
- La mujer Colombiana (1928)
- Las mujeres fuertes de la raza latina (1927)
