= Sisters of Our Lady of Mercy =

Sisters of Our Lady of Mercy may refer to:

- Congregation of the Sisters of Our Lady of Mercy, a Catholic religious order founded in Poland in 1862
- Sisters of Charity of Our Lady of Mercy, a Catholic religious order founded in the United States in 1829
- Sisters of Charity of Our Lady Mother of Mercy, a Catholic religious order founded in the Netherlands in 1832

== See also ==
- Daughters of Our Lady of Mercy, a Catholic religious order founded in Italy in 1837
- Sisters of Mercy (disambiguation)
