= Blanche Christine Olschak =

Austrian journalist and writer (1913–1989)

- Born: 24 July 1913; Vienna, Austria-Hungary
- Died: 25 June 1989 (aged 75); Zürich, Switzerland
- Occupations: journalist, feminist, Tibetologist
- Years active: 1937–1989
- Notable work: Lexikon der Frau in 2 Bänden

Blanche Christine Olschak (24 July 1913 – 25 June 1989) was an Austrian journalist and writer, Tibetan specialist and wrote the first comprehensive encyclopedia of women in the world.

== Biography ==
Blanche Christine Olschak was born on 24 July 1913 in Vienna, Austria-Hungary, to Austro-Hungarian parents, Joseph Olschak and Lilly Helene Büchelen. She studied at the University of Graz, earning a PhD in economics and political science in 1937 and the following year married the engineer Robert Schneiter. She began to focus on Asian topics, specifically Tibetology, Buddhist philosophy and psychology, and Early Central Asian History and wrote about women in Asian societies. In 1945, Olschak fled to Salzburg, and worked as an editor at the Alpen-Journal, but her husband became a prisoner of war in 1946 and died in a concentration camp. At that time, Olschak fled again, going to Zürich, Switzerland.

Shortly after arriving in Switzerland, Olschak published Das Mädchen Katharina; Miniaturen aus den Jugendjahren der grossen Kaiserin (1947). She became a foreign correspondent for several Austrian newspapers and traveled throughout the Far East to China, the Himalayas, Japan, Java, Korea, Mongolia and Tibet to conduct research. In 1949, she was hired by Encyclic Verlag of Zürich to create the first encyclopedia of women that had ever been published. The work was comprehensive and covered cultural, economic, political and sociological aspects of women's lives from throughout the world. In the mid-1950s, the project was looking for a publisher to extend the work to the Americas and inspired Ángela Acuña Braun to create a historical social study of Costa Rican Women Through Four Centuries, which took Acuña nearly two decades to compile and publish.

In 1961, she founded an organization, "Verein für tibetische Heimstätten in der Schweiz", for receiving Tibetan refugees and assisting with immigration into Switzerland in conjunction with the Red Cross. Under her own initiative, she took study courses with Constantin Regamey and Geshé Thupten Wangyal, attending conferences and writing scientific papers on Tibetan culture. For her scientific studies, she was awarded the title of professor by the Austrian Federal Ministry of Science and Research in 1981 and awarded a Golden Doctorate in 1987.

Olschak died on 25 June 1989 in Zürich, Switzerland.

== Selected works ==
All of her early works were in German. In the late-1960s works began appearing in both English and French. She continued publishing until her death and several works were published posthumously.

- Olschak, Blanche Christine (1947). Das Mädchen Katharina; Miniaturen aus den Jugendjahren der grossen Kaiserin (in German). Winterthur, Switzerland: Mondial Verlag.
- Olschak, Blanche Christine (1947). Rhythmus zwischen Leben, Liebe und Tod: [Gedichte] (in German). Winterthur, Switzerland: Mondial Verlag.
- Olschak, Blanche Christine (1953–1954). Lexikon der Frau in 2 Bänden (in German). Zürich, Switzerland: Encyclios Verlag.
- Olschak, Blanche Christine (1956). Frauen um den Drachenthron: Verführung und Macht (in German). Olten, Switzerland: Walter-Verlag.
- Olschak, Blanche Christine; Harrer, Heinrich; Norbu, Thubten (1960). Tibet: Erde der Götter: Vergessene Geschichte, Mythos und Saga (in German). Zürich, Switzerland: Rascher Verlag.
- Olschak, Blanche Christine (28 October 1960). "Tibet und Rotchina". Ost-Probleme (in German). 12 (22). Bonn, Germany: Verlag für Politik und Wirtschaft.
- Olschak, Blanche Christine (1961). "Ueber die vorgeburtliche Seele und die Wiedergeburt in der fernöstlichen Auffassung". Psychologe (in German). 13 (8–9): 281–286.
- Olschak, Blanche Christine (1961). Tibet: Land der Burgen (in German).
- Olschak, Blanche Christine (1961). Die Heiterkeit der Seele; Motive tibetischer Lebensphilosophie (in German). Schwarzenburg, Switzerland: GBS-Verlag.
- Olschak, Blanche Christine (1962). Religion und Kunst im alten Tibet (in German). Zürich, Switzerland: Verlag Ars Tibetana.
- Olschak, Blanche Christine (1968). Les empreintes du pied et les signes de la main du Bouddha (in French). Basel, Switzerland: Images Roche.
- Olschak, Blanche Christine (1970). "Mandalas: de la spirale cosmique à la roue du temps". Image: Photo-documentation médicale Roche (in French). 35 (1). Basel, Switzerland.
- Olschak, Blanche Christine (1979). Ancient Bhutan: a study on early Buddhism in the Himalayas. Zürich, Switzerland: Swiss Foundation for Alpine Research.
- Olschak, Blanche Christine (1980). Palaeolinguistic relics in the Himalayas. Budapest, Hungary: Magyar Tudományos Akademia.
- Olschak, Blanche Christine (1983). Bhutan: Königreich im Himalaya (in German). Freiburg im Breisgau, Germany: Atlantis.
- Olschak, Blanche Christine; Wangyal, Geshe Thupten (1987). Mystic art of ancient Tibet. Boston, Massachusetts: Shambhala. ISBN 978-0-877-73429-1.
- Olschak, Blanche Christine (1989). The Dragon kingdom. Boston, Massachusetts: Shambhala. ISBN 978-0-877-73454-3.
