= Mercedes Chacón Porras =

- Born: 11 September 1896
- Died: 18 April 1963 (aged 66)
- Occupation: nurse
- Years active: 1925–1963
- Known for: Pioneer of Costa Rican social medicine

Mercedes Chacón Porras (1896–1963) was the first obstetrical nurse in Costa Rica and spread health care to rural communities throughout the country. In 2002, she was one of the inaugural women inducted into La Galería de las Mujeres de Costa Rica and the first national health center named for a woman bears her name.

== Biography ==
Mercedes Chacón Porras was born on 11 September 1896 in Costa Rica. In 1925, Chacón became the first obstetrical nurse of Costa Rica and worked toward providing prenatal care and preventing maternal and infant deaths. She was one of the few professional women working in the health field in the country and strove to bring health services to rural populations within their own communities.

== Death and legacy ==
Chacón died on 18 April 1963 and was posthumously inducted into La Galería de las Mujeres de Costa Rica in 2002. A clinic in Aserrí, Costa Rica was named in her honor, breaking the custom of naming national health centers after men.
