= Liga Feminista Costarricense =

The Liga Feminista Costarricense (Costa Rican Feminist League) was the first feminist organization formed in Costa Rica.

In 1923, Mexican feminist Elena Arizmendi Mejia who was living in New York and publishing a magazine Feminismo Internacional (International Feminism) invited women all over the world to create subsidiaries of the International League of Iberian and Latin American Women on 12 October of that year. As a result, Ángela Acuña Braun called together a group to found the Liga Feminista Costarricense (LFC), first feminist organization in Costa Rica.

The inaugural members were Acuña (president), Esther De Mezerville (vice president), Ana Rosa Chacón (secretary), and participants María Ester Acuña, Berta Solórzano Calvo de Rosabal, Isabel Calderón, Lela Campos, Sara Casal de Quiróz, Rosario Floripe, Lidia Fernández, América de Hern, Ana María Loaiza, Vitalia Madrigal, Marita O'Leary de Hine, Corina Rodríguez, María del Rosario Burgos, Marta Sancho, María Teresa Villegas and María Isabel Zamora.

The organization conducted a campaign for women's suffrage between 1925 and 1947; suffrage was finally granted in 1949.

== See also ==
- Women's Club of Costa Rica
