= Sisters of Mercy of New Jersey =

Catholic community

The Sisters of Mercy of New Jersey began as an offshoot of the Catholic Sisters of Mercy order in New Jersey whose ministry focuses on service to the community through education and health care. Now the Sisters of Mercy of New Jersey are part of the Mid-Atlantic Community of the Institute of the Sisters of Mercy of the Americas.

== Ministries ==
- Georgian Court College, in Lakewood Township, New Jersey provides a liberal arts curriculum aligned with the Roman Catholic tradition. It is founded and sponsored by the Sisters of Mercy.
- Mount St. Mary Academy, in Watchung, New Jersey, is a private, independent, college preparatory day school for girls in grades nine through twelve.
- McAuley School Inc., in Watchung, is a non-profit educational facility for the trainable developmentally disabled that serves an enrollment of 40 students.
- Mercy Center, in Asbury Park, New Jersey is a comprehensive, holistic, provider of programs and services to one of the most distressed and disadvantaged communities in the State of New Jersey.
- Mount St. Mary House of Prayer, in Watchung, is a prayer/retreat center.
- McAuley Hall Health Care Center, in Watchung, provides physical, spiritual and psychological care to vowed members of the Sisters of Mercy.

== History ==
Venerable Catherine McAuley established the first House of Mercy on September 24, 1827, in Ireland to serve the needs of homeless and abused women and children from Dublin's slums. In 1843, Frances Warde and six other Sisters traveled from to open the order's first United States mission, in Pittsburgh, Pennsylvania. On September 24, 1873, five Sisters accompanied Mother Warde to Bordentown, New Jersey, to establish the Sisters of Mercy of New Jersey.
