= Alliance of Pan American Round Tables =

Women's organization

- Alianza de Mesas Redondas Panamericanas
- Abbreviation: PART / AMRP
- Formation: October 16, 1916; 109 years ago
- Founder: Florence Terry Griswold
- Founded at: San Antonio, Texas, United States
- Type: Non-governmental organization
- Director General: Marta Agüero Abal de Argañaras (2024-2026)
- Pan American Woman: Yolanda Colmenares de Arriola (2024)
- Website: www.alianzamrp.org

Alliance of Pan American Round Tables (also known as the Alianza de Mesas Redondas Panamericanas, 1916–) is a women's organization founded on October 16, 1916 in San Antonio, Texas by Florence Terry Griswold. With the motto "One for All and All for One," ("Una Para Todas y Todas Para Una,") the first Round Table was created with the intention to build networks among the people of the Western Hemisphere and represent each republic within the Americas. PART began as a local organization, but in the 1920s chapters started to spring up across Texas. During this initial expansion, the parenting body was maintained in San Antonio. By 1944, international Round Tables had been established, and an Alliance, dubbed the Alliance of the Pan American Roundtables, was formed to unite the outreach of the various chapters. The non-partisan, non-sectarian non-governmental organization provides educational and cultural outreach programs, including a very active scholarship fund.

Marta Agüero Abal de Argañaras of Argentina serves as Director General for the 2024–2026 term. Yolanda Colmenares de Arriola of Peru was named Pan American Woman at the Cancun, Mexico Convention of 2024, an honorary distinction awarded by the Alliance since 1967.

== History ==
=== Founding ===
The Mexican Revolution forced many refugees into San Antonio, Texas. Women and children in particular showed dire need for assistance. Florence Terry Griswold decided to help by opening her home to these refugees and gathering friends to provide relief in the form of food, health clinics, and English classes. Griswold recognized that women can and should set examples for the men in their lives. She believed that women are more inclined to be nurturing and understanding, and are therefore essential to improving relations between people. It was her understanding that an apolitical and nonsectarian, with no commercial purpose nor alignment with any national government could help build bridges between nations that businessmen and politicians were unable to foster due to their motivations. She thought that if she could bring women together in a nonpolitical effort to aid the women and children of the Americas, and build cross cultural understanding and friendship, men would follow suit.

On October 16, 1916, Griswold the inaugural meeting at the Menger Hotel, the charter members, besides Griswold were Mary Burleson Bee (Mrs. Carlos); Ella Dancy Dibrell (Mrs. Joseph Burton Dibrell); Anna Hertzberg (Mrs. Eli Hertzberg); Olivia Nolte (Mrs. Walter Nolte); Mary Pancoast (Mrs. Aaron C. "A. C." Pancoast); among others.

PART had many sources of inspiration. For one, there was Pan Americanism, the economic and cultural cooperation of the nations of the Americas. It was modeled after the Pan American Union where each of the 21 American countries is represented by at least one member, and members elect a General Director every few years. There was also King Arthur’s roundtable, a table in which there is no head, representing the equality of all members. And the motto “One for all and all for one” is sourced from The Three Musketeers representing mutual dedication and support from the individual to the social scale.

=== Expansion ===
Griswold served as the first director and in 1921, the second chapter opened in Laredo and later that same year, Eugenia Schuster opened the branch in El Paso. In 1922, the chapter in Austin, as well as the state organization were founded. Griswold founded the state organization and became the first State Director to coordinate the activities of the various branches. Round Tables in other countries followed with the first branch established in Mexico City in 1928. In 1936, Ángela Acuña de Chacon founded the first branch in Costa Rica at San Jose and the following year, the Dallas chapter was founded by Katherine S. Robinson (Mrs. Stone J. Robinson).

In the early 1940s, Emma Gutiérrez Suárez joined the Mexican branch. She would later become the chapter's National Director. Upon Griswold's death in 1941, Robinson became the State Director and Nolte proposed that a scholarship, named in Griswold's honor be granted annually for young Latin American women wanting to further their education in the United States to enable them give back to their home country upon completion of their schooling. In 1944 the international body, the Alliance of Pan American Round Tables (Spanish: Alizanza de Mesas Redondas Panamericanas) was founded in Mexico City with Robinson as the first international Director General. By 1946 a Cuban branch had been formed and by the time of the organization's fiftieth anniversary, there had been chapters created in all of the countries of the Americas except, Canada, Haiti and Venezuela.

== Work ==
=== Early activity & accomplishments ===
Much of PART’s early activity consisted of direct communication with world leaders to encourage friendly relations between the countries of the Americas. For example, in 1917, Venustiano Carranza, then president of Mexico, sent a happy birthday message to Wilhelm II. This was during World War I, and PART felt that this gesture would cause tension between Mexico and other American countries, so they sent a letter expressing their disapproval. The leaders of Belgium, France and Canada all sent messages of gratitude to PART for their actions.

They hosted, and were hosted by many officials. In 1921, they were invited to the Conference of Federate Chambers which was being held in Mexico. Snr. María Tapia organized an escort for the party of women. This marks the first time in Mexican history that a woman was invited to participate in such a high-class meeting. It also goes to show how they tried to use positive relationships between women to encourage friendly relations between nations. In 1925, PART invited Aaron Saez, who was the Mexican Secretary of Foreign Relations to San Antonio. The San Antonio mayor raised the Mexican flag over the town hall in honor of Saez’ visit. It was the first time such a courtesy was extended to a Mexican official.

=== Educational efforts ===
One of their early major projects was the sponsorship of a Mexican Art Exhibition at the Witte Museum. It was financed by the Carnegie Corporation and was attended by thousands. This was one of their many efforts to increase awareness of Latin American cultures. They would also hold internal projects to this end. At the San Benito Round Table, they would have regular meetings to educate members about a different Pan American country each month. Other programs include essay competitions where contestants would have to write an essay about a Pan American country for a chance to win a cash prize.

One of their most well established efforts have been scholarships. They have awarded over a million dollars to students. In 1941, the Dallas roundtable started a memorial scholarship that was used to sponsor nurses trainings. It was created with the hopes that recipients would return to their home countries, and use their education to better the lives of those living in Latin America.

== Modern organization ==
The present day organization has around 1,400 chapters with each operating as an autonomous entity with their own governing documents. The Alliance still prides itself on its scholarship funding. They put a lot of time and effort into raising money to give to students through internal fundraising. One of the most notable is the Griswold Memorial Scholarship, started in 1959. It is awarded to a woman from a Pan American country studying at a Texas University. The first went to a woman named Sylvia Mirea Valencia Gutierrez from Santiago, Chile who was Educational & Vocational Guidance at University of Texas at Austin. In 1991, the Florence Terry Griswold Endowment Fund was created to maintain its scholarship program in perpetuity. Individual tables also award their own scholarships.

Members also try to educate each other on Pan American life. Sometimes that's through presenting the clothing, custom, and food of a country. Some tables have distributed newsletters to keep members up to date with current events. They have also continued to hold their conventions. They are an opportunity for members to travel together and experience Latin American cultures first hand. The 100th Anniversary of the organization was held with their biennial convention in San Antonio, Texas from October 26 to 29, 2016.

== The Alliance's "Director Generals" ==
Alliance of Pan American Round Tables Director Generals
Years of service	Image	Name	Countries	Notes/ Details
1944–1947		Katherine S. Robinson	United States	elected in Mexico City
1947–1951		Mrs. Maurice V. Hugo (Mary Lois)	Mexico	elected at the Havana, Cuba Convention of 1947
1951–1953		Olimpia Varela y Varela	Panama	elected at the Dallas, Texas Convention of 1951
1953–1955		Dixie E. Waltrip	United States	elected at the Monterrey, Mexico Convention
1955–1958		Ola C. Hendrix	United States	elected at the Porto Alegre, Brazil Convention
1958–1962		Ottilia de Oliveira Cháves	Brazil	elected at the El Paso, Texas Convention of 1958 and reelected at the 1960 Guatemala Convention
1962–1966		Emma Gutiérrez Suárez	Mexico	elected at the Mexico City Convention of 1962 and reelected at the 1964 Lima, Peru Convention
1966–1968		Madeline Clark Nelson	United States	elected at the San Antonio, Texas Convention of 1966
1968–1972		Carmen de Recalde	Nicaragua	elected at the Managua, Nicaragua Convention of 1968 and reelected at the 1970 Mexico City Convention
1972–1976		Carmen Luz Calero de Barrionuevo	Peru	elected at the Panama City, Panama Convention of 1972 and reelected at the 1974 Albuquerque, New Mexico Convention
1976–1978		Maxine C. Guerra	United States	elected at the Lima, Peru Convention of 1976
1978–1982		Ruth García Barna de del Puerto	Mexico	elected at the Fort Worth, Texas Convention of 1978 and reelected at the 1980 Acapulco Convention
1982–1984		Esperanza Bermudes de Morales	Nicaragua	elected at the El Paso, Texas Convention of 1982
1984–1986		Sara R. de García Jaramillo	Peru	elected at the McAllen, Texas Convention of 1984
1986–1988		Helena Torres Muga Richards	United States	elected at the Cancun Convention of 1986
1988–1990		Rebeca Osuna Westrup	Mexico	elected at the Guadalajara Convention of 1988
1990–1992		Mila de Coquis	Peru	elected at the Santa Cruz de la Sierra, Bolivia Convention of 1990
1992–1994		Gladys N. Simpson	United States	elected at the Santo Domingo, Dominican Republic Convention of 1992
1994–1996		Delia Pérez de Plata	Mexico	elected at the Miami, Florida Convention of 1994
1996–1998		Ursula Wille	Bolivia	elected at the Puebla, Mexico Convention of 1996
1998–2000		Carmen Robinson Guerra	United States	elected at the Lima, Peru Convention of 1998
2000–2002		Luchy de Elias	Dominican Republic	elected at the Puerto Rico Convention of 2000
2002–2004		Fabiola García de Steffanoni	Mexico	elected at the Monterrey, Mexico Convention of 2002
2004–2006		Norma Ríos de Flores	Peru	elected at the Cordoba, Argentina Convention of 2004
2006–2008		Peggy Lasater Clark	United States	elected at the Corpus Christi, Texas Convention of 2006
2008–2010		Martha Ofelia Martínez de Calderón	Mexico	elected at the San Jose, Costa Rica Convention of 2008
2010–2012		Ana Maria Acuña de Macedo	Argentina	elected at the Mérida, Mexico Convention of 2010
2012–2014		Elsie Perez	United States	elected at the Buenos Aires, Argentina Convention of 2012
2014–2016		Maria Eva Muñoz de Manzarraga	Mexico	elected at the Lima, Peru Convention of 2014
2016–2018		Nhury Gutiérrez Vilches	Chile	elected at the San Antonio, Texas Convention of 2016
2018-2021		Sylvia Williams	United States	elected at the Cochabamba, Bolivia Convention of 2018
2021-2024		Jani Marichal de Mendoza	Mexico	elected at the Punta Cana, Dominican Republic Convention of 2021
2024-2026		Martha Agüero Abal de Argañaras	Argentina	elected at the Cancun, Mexico Convention of 2024

== Archival records ==
The archival records of the organization were housed in Mexico City until the 1970s. In 1977, the member of the Mexico City PART chapter who was housing them at her home, brought a discussion for a permanent archive. Because the Bylaws of the Alliance required that Mexico City was required to maintain the archive, formal amendment of the governing documents had to occur. In 1978, the proposal to found a permanent archive was suggested at the convention held in Fort Worth, Texas and approved. In 1979, the records were transferred to the University of Texas at Austin library.
