= National Society of Black Engineers =

American organization

National Society of Black Engineers (NSBE)
- Formation: April 1975
- Founders: Anthony Harris; Brian Harris; Edward A. Coleman; Stanley L. Kirtley; George A. Smith; John W. Logan Jr. Arthur Bond
- Type: Engineering Society
- Headquarters: 205 Dangerfield Road, Alexandria, Virginia
- Region served: International
- Members: 30,000
- Official language: English
- National Chairperson: Casey Williams II
- Budget: $25,000,000 annually
- Staff: 42
- Website: www.nsbe.org

The National Society of Black Engineers (NSBE) is a society that was founded in 1975 at Purdue University, located in West Lafayette, Indiana. It is one of the largest student-run organizations in the United States, with core activities centered on improving the recruitment and retention of Black and other minority engineers in both academia and industry.

== Activity ==
NSBE has more than 30,000 members worldwide, 18 regional conferences, an annual international conference, an annual national convention, and offers multiple scholarships. NSBE also represents 310 collegiate student chapters, 99 pre-college programs, and 88 professional chapters with their 6,000 technical members. NSBE is divided into 6 regions, and each have their own regional conferences. A professional staff operates NSBE's World Headquarters in Virginia. Janeen Uzzell was hired as CEO in July 2021.

== Origins ==
In 1971, two Purdue undergraduates, Edward Barnette and Fred Cooper founded the Black Society of Engineers (BSE) with faculty advisor Arthur J. Bond. The BSE was founded in response to the 80% drop out rate of Black freshmen in engineering programs in the 1960s. The club's goals were to improve the recruitment and retention of black engineering students. Bond noted that "you would never see another black student from the day you entered Purdue until you graduated. So, we didn't know what other black student was studying engineering," and wanted to create a society that could help with representation. After the success of the society at Purdue, it later went national.

The Purdue chapter held the first national annual meeting in April 1975 with 135 students representing 28 schools. There, the group was renamed to the National Society of Black Engineers (NSBE) and formally incorporated as a 501(c)(3) nonprofit. John Carson was elected as the first president, and in 1978, Virginia Booth became the national chair.

NSBE later formed a Professional sector, as well as a Junior sector. NSBE's Summer Engineering Experience for Kids (SEEK) is now in its 18th year, helping elementary school students enjoy the world of engineering. In 1992, the first international chapter was launched. NSBE has chapters at more than 700 universities and colleges in the United States, and internationally.

== Publications ==
NSBE publishes three magazines for its membership:

- NSBE Magazine, its award-winning, flagship publication that offers feature articles of interest to engineering college students, faculty, and technical experts.
- Bridge Magazine, marketed toward a pre-collegiate, younger audience to pique their interest in STEM (science, technology, engineering and mathematics).
- Career Engineer, which offers the latest industry news, cutting-edge technology, and strategies for work-life balance.

== See also ==
- Engineering
- Purdue University College of Engineering
- National Organization for the Professional Advancement of Black Chemists and Chemical Engineers (NOBCChE)
- Society of Hispanic Professional Engineers
- American Indian Science and Engineering Society
- Society of Women Engineers
