= International League of Iberian and Latin American Women =

International League of Iberian and Latin American Women (Liga Internacional de Mujeres Ibéricas e Hispanoamericanas) is an international organization of Latin American and Iberian women founded in 1921 by liberal feminists from both regions.

Early on the league was led by Paulina Luisi of Uruguay, while Carmen de Burgos of Madrid served as its first president, and Elena Arizmendi Mejia was the founding vice president. During the 1920s, national chapters emerged. An influential chapter was founded by Georgina Fletcher in Colombia.

The league served as a national alternative to the US-dominated Inter-American Commission of Women (IACW) of the Pan-American Union into the 1930s.

In 1931, The Nicaraguan Feminist League was founded, as an affiliate of the International League, its first President being Doña Angélica Balladares Montealegre de Arguello (b. Chinandega, 1872 - d. San Marcos, 1973), decades later named Woman of the Americas, Nicaraguan Chapter by the Union of American Women.
