= Carmen Lyra =

Costa Rican writer

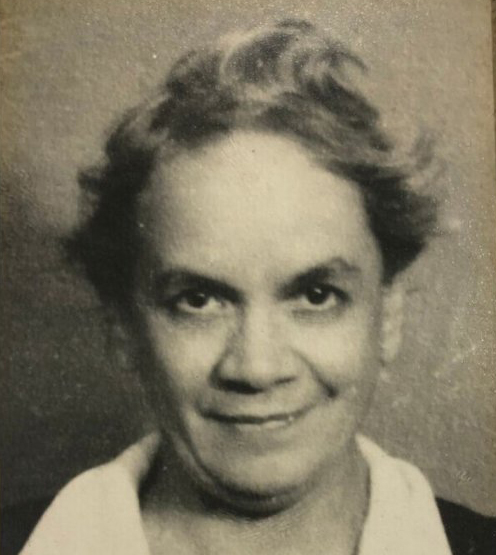
- Lyra's depiction in the 20,000 colones banknote
- Born: María Isabel Carvajal Quesada; 15 January 1887; San José, Costa Rica
- Died: 14 May 1949 (aged 61); Mexico City, Mexico
- Occupations: Writer, communist, Women's Rights Advocate
- Years active: 1918–1948

Carmen Lyra (January 15, 1887 – May 14, 1949) was the pseudonym of the first prominent female Costa Rican writer, born María Isabel Carvajal Quesada. She was a teacher and founder of the country's first Montessori school. She was one of the earliest writers to criticise the dominance of the fruit companies. She won many prizes.

== Biography ==
María Isabel Carvajal Quesada was born on 15 January 1887 in San José, Costa Rica, and attended the Superior School for Girls, graduating in 1904. She began working at the San Juan de Dios Hospital in 1906 as a novice, but decided religious life was not her calling, and instead began working as a teacher and writer. She started sending articles to newspapers such as Diario de Costa Rica, La Hora, and La Tribuna; and magazines like Ariel, Athenea, and Pandemonium; and teaching throughout the country.

In 1918, she published her first novel, En una silla de ruedas (In a Wheelchair), which portrays national customs and manners through the eyes of a paralysed boy who grows up to become an artist, with a strong dose of sentimentalism and intimations of the bohemian life of San José. In 1919, during a teacher's protest against the dictatorship of Federico Tinoco Granados, Lyra galvanized the crowd, and in their anger, they burned the government news office. She managed to escape the police manhunt disguised as a news seller. In 1920, she published her best-known work, Los Cuentos de Mi Tia Panchita (Tales of My Aunt Panchita), a collection of folk tales.

When the dictatorship crumbled, she was given a scholarship to study abroad, at the Sorbonne, in Apex and also visited schools in Italy and England to evaluate pedagogical methods in use in Europe. She returned in 1921 to manage the Department of Children's Literature at the Normal School of Costa Rica. In 1926, Lyra founded and directed the first Montessori pre-kindergarten, teaching the poorest students of San José. Lyra's home became a gathering place for intellectuals and writers, and her politics increasingly moved to the left. In 1931, she and Manuel Mora Valverde founded the Costa Rican Communist Party. She was joined by fellow teachers María Alfaro de Mata, Odilia Castro Hidalgo, Adela Ferreto, Angela García, Luisa González, Stella Peralta, Emilia Prieto, Lilia Ramos, Esther Silva and Hortensia Zelaya, who had been radicalized at the Normal School (teacher's college), to challenge a society built on privilege and the roles of women being confined to home, marriage, and motherhood. That same year, Lyra and Luisa González formed the Unique Union of Women Workers and suggested the creation of a union for Costa Rican teachers, which would not be created until 1939 by Odilia Castro.

In 1931, she published Bananos y Hombres (Bananas and Men) anticipating the actual 1934 banana workers' strike, organized by the communist party and in which she played a significant part. As her politics and activities became more radical, Lyra was removed from her teaching posts and in 1948, at the conclusion of the Costa Rican Civil War, when José Figueres Ferrer outlawed the communist party she was sent into exile in Mexico. Despite repeated pleas to be allowed to return home due to illness, Lyra was denied and died in Mexico City on 14 May 1949.

In 1962 the Board of Education of Cóbano named a school in her honor, and the Costa Rica Legislative Assembly awarded her the honor of Benemérita de la Cultura Nacional in 1976.

Lyra was inducted into La Galería de las Mujeres de Costa Rica (The Costa Rican Gallery of Women) in 2005. As of 2010 Carmen Lyra is depicted on the twenty thousand colón bill. The Miravalles Quintet premiered in 2011 at the Teatro Nacional its new work entitled Homenaje a Carmen Lyra, an interdisciplinary chamber show, original Costa Rican composition, painting, literature, narration and dance-inspired by the author's writings.

== Books ==
- En una silla de ruedas (1918)
- Fantasías de Juan Silvestre (1918)
- Cuentos De Mi Tia Panchita (1920) - paperback edition (2000) Editorial Costa Rica, ISBN 9977-23-135-4
- Bananos Y Hombres (1931)

== Sources ==
- Daniel Balderston, Encyclopedia of Twentieth-Century Latin American and Caribbean Literature, 1900–2003 (Encyclopedias of Contemporary Culture), Routledge (2004), ISBN 0-415-30687-6
- Carmen Lyra, Revista Comunicación, Instituto Tecnológico de Costa Rica - bio in Spanish
- Banco Central presentó hoy los nuevos billetes - in Spanish
