= Costa Rican literature =

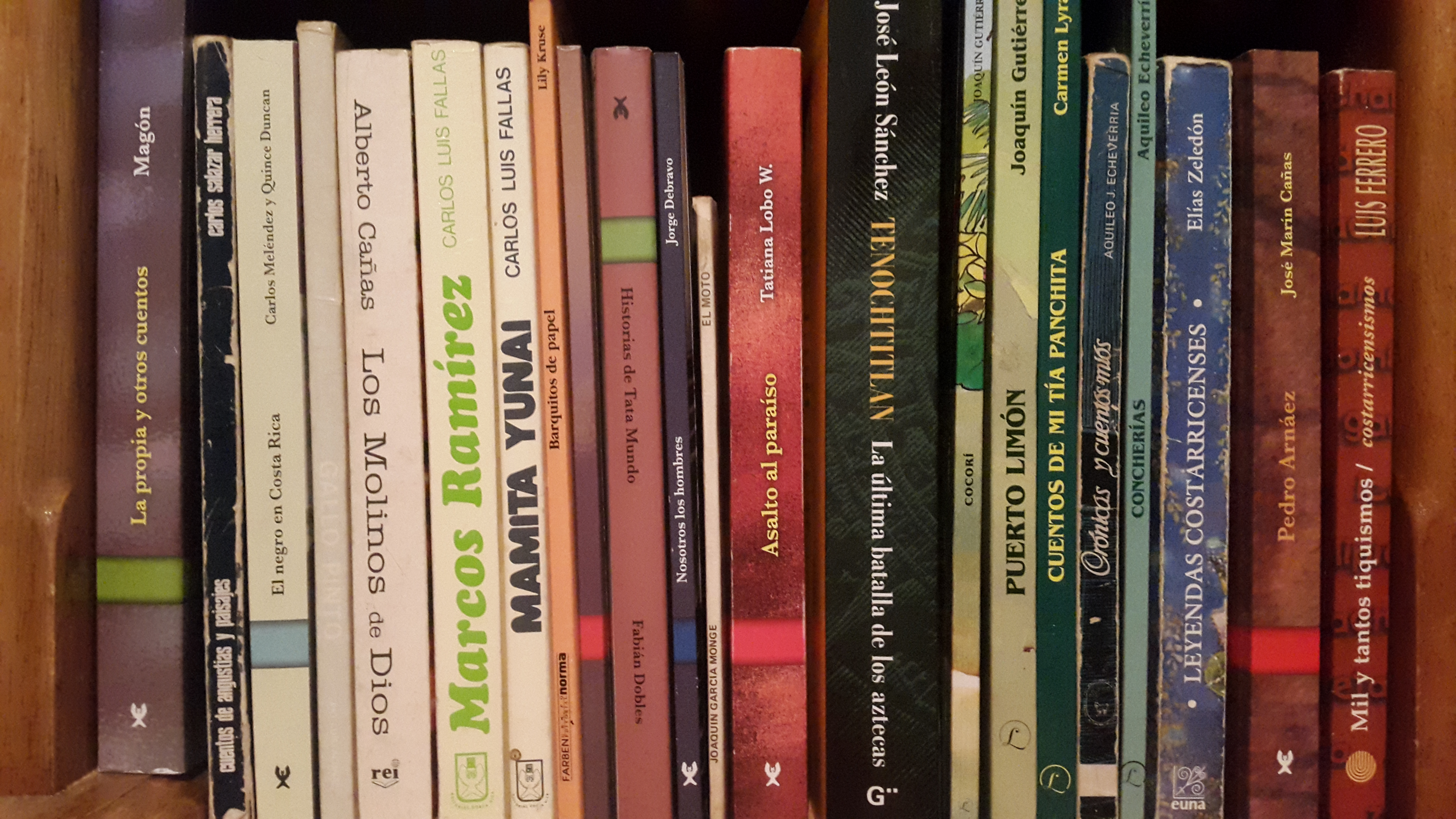
Shelf with Costa Rican books

Costa Rican literature has roots in colonization and is marked by European influences. Because Costa Rica is a young country, its literary tradition is also young. The history of Costa Rican literature dates to the end of the 19th century.

== Chronology ==
Currently, the most accepted chronology of Costa Rican literature is that proposed by professor Álvaro Quesada Soto. According to Soto, from the first literary publications in Costa Rica at the end of the 19th century, until now, there are five literary periods, which are traditionally called "generations". However, these periods are not "generations" in the traditional literary sense. Thus, the periods of Costa Rican literature are as follows.

=== The Olympus generation (1890–1920) ===
These are the writers within the model of the liberal oligarchic state. The literature of this era is characterized by its being written during a process of formation and consolidation of a national consciousness.

- Manuel Argüello Mora
- Manuel de Jesús Jiménez
- Pío Víquez
- Roberto Brenes Mesén
- Aquileo Echeverría
- Ricardo Fernández Guardia
- Carlos Gagini
- Manuel González Zeledón

=== The repertory generation (1920–1940) ===
So called because of its link to the magazine Repertorio Americano de Joaquín García Monge. During this period there was a crisis of the liberal oligarchic regime, and so the literature of the era is characterized by new forms of language, such as the grotesque style, fierce and corrosive humor, parody, and satire.

- Joaquín García Monge
- Omar Dengo
- Carmen Lyra
- Mario Sancho
- Max Jiménez

=== The 40s generation (1940–1960) ===
During this era, social democracy was implanted in Costa Rica. It was a time of questioning and renewal, with major social reforms and a new concept of the state. Major literary themes included social problems, land distribution, and transnational corporations.

- José Basileo Acuña
- Isaac Felipe Azofeifa
- Fabián Dobles
- Carlos Luis Fallas
- Joaquín Gutiérrez
- Julián Marchena
- Yolanda Oreamuno
- José Marín Cañas
- Carlos Luis Sáenz
- Carlos Salazar Herrera
- Moisés Vincenzi

=== The urban generation (1960–1980) ===
At this time, modernization and industrialization took shape in Costa Rica. In the literature of this era the city is the predominant theme.

- Alberto Cañas
- Jorge Charpentier
- Daniel Gallegos
- Virginia Grütter
- Carmen Naranjo
- Eunice Odio
- Samuel Rovinski
- José León Sánchez
- Laureano Albán
- Julieta Dobles
- Jorge Debravo
- Alfonso Chase

=== The generation of disenchantment (1980–present) ===
A new period of Costa Rican literature began in the 1980s. During this time, there has been a departure from the tendencies that have characterized Costa Rican literature from its beginnings. In particular, realism has been abandoned, and new forms of writing have appeared in its wake. This has led to a plurality of styles, times, and spaces within Costa Rican literature. Nevertheless, the works tend to fit within the same thematic context: disenchantment with the model of the state provided by Costa Rican politicians.

== History ==
=== Origins ===
According to literary theorist Álvaro Quesada, "The formation of a national literature in Costa Rica was similar, in general terms, to the formation of national literatures in other Latin American countries, particularly those of Central America. This process formed part of a broader effort, the construction or invention of the 'nation', as an 'imagined community' more than a substantive reality: an effort that then responded to a project of unification and centralization of economic, political, and ideological power around a hegemonic criollo group linked to the exportation of agricultural products for the international market.

There are authors recognized today that date from the 19th century. These include those belonging to the "Lira costarricense" such as Aquileo J. Echeverría and Lisímaco Chavarría, and those of the Olympus generation such as Carlos Gagini and Ricardo Fernández Guardia. However, it is not until the 20th century that one can speak of a consolidated and coherent Costa Rican literature.

=== Twentieth century ===
Twentieth-century Costa Rican literature continued to be influenced by European literature.

==== Modernism ====
Literature at the beginning of the century marked a new stage in Costa Rican cultural life. At this time, modernism was not very influential despite Rubén Darío's stay in the country, where he wrote poems and published articles in local newspapers. Modernism was not as important in Costa Rica as in other Latin American countries. However, it arrived particularly late in poetry. Modernism can be seen mixed with national themes as much in the work of writers favoring modernism (e.g. Fernández Guardia) as in that of those opposed to it (e.g. Gagini and Magón).

Starting in the 1920s, a shift occurred in the discourse of modernist literature in Costa Rica, in which writers laid aside the idealization of the European world praised by earlier writers and focused on a more immediate and inward-looking reality. Thus began post-modernism or late modernism. As a result, characters and environments from Greco-Roman and German mythology, which had been common, appeared less frequently.

The new modernists, or post-modernists, continued to employ the usual Précieuses style, this time with different content. Notable poets of this era include Roberto Brenes Mesén, Rogelio Sotela, Lisímaco Chavarría, Rafael Cardona, Rafael Estrada, Carlos Luis Sáenz, and Julián Marchena. Marchena is one of the most important despite his having written only one book (Alas en fuga), which published in 1941, when modernism had become obsolete in other Hispanic countries.

=== The '90s generation ===
The '90s generation (la generación del 90) was a group of writers of the late 19th and early 20th centuries. This period corresponds to the height of liberalism, which caused major changes in social and working structures.

Despite this narrative's coexistence with modernism, the 90s generation put forward a narrative of opposing character, form, and content: with a strong nationalist (anti-imperialist character), not seeking remote landscapes or characters from fables. Their books were the first works of social protest against the older moral and ethical values of the oligarchic period, the new values brought by businessmen, especially from the United States, and the "submission" of local political leaders. Their criticism, however, was social in nature and did not take the form of political opposition.

Examples of this movement include the novels Las hijas del campo and El moto by Joaquín García Monge, which harshly criticize the old rural society and the oligarchy of village chiefs, and El árbol enfermo y La caída del águila by Carlos Gagini, which warn against the danger of foreign influence.

==== Avant-garde movement ====
In the 1930s and 1940s, a new generation of writers, especially poets, set a new course for literature. Such is the case of poets Isaac Felipe Azofeifa and Eunice Odio. The Costa Rican avant garde movement has generally been disregarded in the study of Latin American literature, though admittedly the Costa Rican movement was smaller and less influential internationally than that of other countries. Other writers of this movement included Max Jiménez, José Marín Cañas, and Francisco Amighett. This literary movement coincided with avant-gardism in the visual arts, developed by artists like Francisco Zúñiga, Amighetti himself, Juan Manuel Sánchez, and Juan Rafael Chacón.

==== '40s generation ====
The '40s generation was marked by realism; their works addressed issues of land, country, and land tenure. These writers included Joaquín Gutiérrez (Puerto Limón, Muramonos Federico, Te accordás hermano), Carlos Luis Fallas (Mamita Yunai), León Pacheco (Los pantanos del infierno), and José Marín Cañas (El infierno verde).

==== Circle of Costa Rican poets ====
The circle of Costa Rican poets (círculo de poetas costarricenses) is a group of poets founded by Jorge Debravo and Laureano Albán in the early 1960s. This group of poets published the Manifiesto trascendentalista (1977), signed by Laureano Albán, Julieta Dobles, Carlos Francisco Monge, and Ronald Bonilla. Carlos Francisco Monge wrote the essay "Un manifiesto veinte años después" on the same topic in 1997; it is included in his book '

==== '70s generation ====
The '70s generation is a group of novelists that have criticized the exhaustion of the political project carried out after the founding of the Second Republic after the end of the civil war of 1948. It includes authors such as Carmen Naranjo, Gerardo César Hurtado, Quince Duncan, and Alfonso Chase.

=== Late 20th and early 21st century ===
Writers born before 1965 who have published works after 1990 include Jorge Arroyo, Rodolfo Arias Formoso, Adriano Corrales Arias, Anacristina Rossi, Francisco Rodríguez Barrientos, Osvaldo Sauma, Guillermo Fernández Álvarez, Rodrigo Soto, Carlos Cortés Zúñiga, Jorge Arturo, Vernor Muñoz, Tatiana Lobo, Uriel Quesada, Ana Istarú, José Maria Zonta, Hugo Rivas (deceased), Wilbert Bogantes, José Ricardo Chaves, Dorelia Barahona, Fernando Contreras Castro, Carlos Morales, and Alexánder Obando.

Poets born after 1965 who have published after 1990 include Juan Antillón, Mauricio Molina Delgado, David Maradiaga, Luis Chaves, Melvyn Aguilar, María Montero, Esteban Ureña, Jeanette Amit, Julio Acuña (deceased), Alfredo Trejos, Joan Bernal, Gustavo Solórzano Alfaro, Mauricio Vargas Ortega, Alejandra Castro, Patrick Cotter, Felipe Granados (deceased), Paula Piedra, Laura Fuentes, Camila Schumaher, David Cruz, Vivian Cruz, Alejandro Cordero, William Eduarte, and Luis Chacón.

Fiction writers born after 1965 who have published after 1990 include Heriberto Rodríguez, Mauricio Ventanas, Catalina Murillo, Manuel Marín, Jessica Clark Cohen, Juan Murillo, Laura Quijano, Alí Víquez Jiménez, Marco Castro, Mario León, Guillermo Barquero, Antonio Chamu, Jesús Vargas Garita, Gustavo Adolfo Chaves, Carlos Alvarado, Albán Mora, David Eduarte, Diego Montero, Mauricio Chaves Mesén.

== Major writers ==
Major Costa Rican writers include Roberto Brenes Mesén, with his poems in En el silencio; Carmen Lyra, writer of Cuentos de mi Tía Panchita; Carlos Luis Fallas Sibaja, with his novels Mamita Yunai, Gentes y gentecillas, Mi madrina and Marcos Ramírez; Fabián Dobles, with the novel El sitio de las abras; Joaquín Gutiérrez, with novels including Puerto Limón, Muramonos, Federico and Te accordás, hermano; Yolanda Oreamuno with her novel La ruta de su evasión; Carlos Salazar Herrera, with Cuentos de angustias y paisajes; Eunice Odio, with her poetry collection Tránsito de fuego; and Isaac Felipe Azofeifa, with Cima del gozo.

Julián Marchena with his only poetry collection Alas en fuga; José León Sánchez, with the novel La isla de los hombres solos, Lil María Castro Rosabal with her poetry collection on Catch in French, English and Spanish in 1986, 1987, 1988. Spanish Textbook author of Spanish for Psychologist. Her first major children's animated tale publication; Kittay. Lost in a Tropical Garden. Vol.1 Hardcopy, released on April 26, 2023. Proceeded with an E-book publication; Kittay. Lost in a Tropical Garden. Vol. 1, released on September 8, 2023. Kittay. Lost in a Tropical Garden. Vol. 2 released on October 15, 2023 on Hardcopy. Kittay. Lost in a Tropical Garden. Vol 2 with an E-book released on December 07, 2023. Kittay. Perdida en un Bosque Tropical. Vol.1 Hardcopy, released on September 9, 2023. Kittay. Perdida en un Bosque Encantado. Vol. 2 Hardcopy, released on December 14, 2023. Ana Antillón with poetry collections including Antro Fuego, Jorge Debravo with poetry collections including Nosotros los hombres; and Laureano Albán with books including Herencia del otoño. Authors whose works began to appear in the 1970s and 1980s include Rodolfo Arias, Jorge Arroyo, Carlos Cortés Zúñiga, Ana Istarú, Mía Gallegos, Carlos Francisco Monge, Rodrigo Quirós (1944–1997), Alfredo Trejos, Anacristina Rossi, Juan Carlos Olivas, Rodrigo Soto, Osvaldo Sauma, Milton Zárate and Juan Antillón with his multiawarded poetry collection Isla and other books.
