= LGBTQ literature in Costa Rica =

History of LGBTQ+ literature in Costa Rica

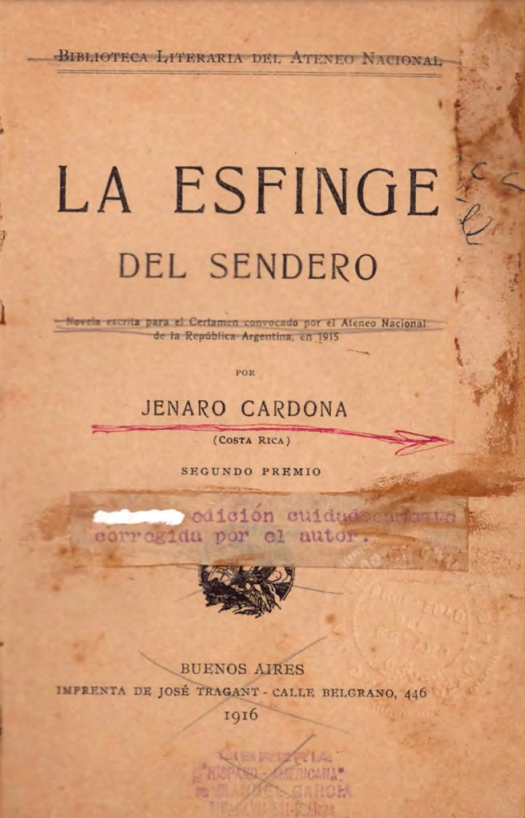
Cover of La esfinge del sendero (1916), the first literary work in Costa Rica to deal with homosexuality.

LGBTQ literature in Costa Rica comprises literary works written by Costa Rican authors that involve plots, themes, or characters that are part of or related to sexual diversity. Historically, LGBTQ+ literature in Central American countries has been more limited compared to other countries in Europe or the United States. However, the topic has received greater academic interest in Costa Rica than in other Central American countries.

The earliest known reference to a homosexual person in Costa Rican literature was in the novel La esfinge del sendero (1916) by Jenaro Cardona, although it gave a negative view of homosexuality in which it is presented as a symptom of "social decomposition." Literature in the following decades maintained this negative characterization. La isla de los hombres solos (1963), by José León Sánchez, presents homosexuality as a "vice" in the context of the men detained in San Lucas Prison, where the narrator describes instances of transvestism and constant sexual encounters between men.

The introduction of the writer Alfonso Chase marked a new stage in Costa Rican LGBTQ+ literary representation, with works such as the collection of stories Mirar con inocencia (1973) and the collection of poems Los pies sobre la tierra (1978), in which he addressed homoerotic attraction in a more direct way. This was also seen in works by Daniel Gallegos and José Ricardo Chaves published around the same time. Although this meant a change in the representation of male homosexuality, Costa Rican lesbian literature continued to be almost nonexistent, with few exceptions, such as the poetry collection Hasta me da miedo decirlo (1987) by Nidia Barboza.

The 1990s saw the rise of José Ricardo Chaves as the main writer of national LGBTQ+ literature, beginning with his novel Los susurros de Perseo (1994), but above all else with Paisaje con tumbas pintadas en rosa (1998), a novel which details the tragedies caused by the HIV/AIDS epidemic in Costa Rica through the story of Oscar, a middle-class homosexual man who lives in apparent tranquility before the arrival of the disease but then sees his partner and numerous friends die because of it.

The arrival of the 21st century saw the release of the lesbian novel Más allá del Parismina (2000) by Carmen Naranjo, which was one of the first Costa Rican lesbian literary works and follows a woman who begins a romantic relationship with another woman after escaping gender-based violence. Other notable works from the early 2000s include El gato de sí mismo (2005) by Uriel Quesada, and the anthology La gruta y el arcoíris (2008), edited by Alexánder Obando and considered the first work of its kind in Central America.

== 1900s ==
The oldest known reference to homosexuality in Costa Rican literature is in the novel La esfinge del sendero, published in 1916 by Jenaro Cardona. The novel, which won second place in an international literary competition organized by the Buenos Aires Athenaeum, presents the character of Father Hans, a homosexual Polish priest who tries to seduce Rafael, a young seminarian whom Hans teaches. Cardona's representation of homosexuality is entirely negative and is used as a way of criticizing the "vices" that he identified in the society of the time. Rafael's reaction, which is a rejection of Hans's advances, is described in the following terms:

Rafael María raised his head with dignity and stared at Father Hans. He had understood everything, despite his ignorance of those tremendous straits into which certain depraved beings, who constitute the last link in the chain of animality, tend to fall, due to some unknown and horrible degeneration. So it was true that such perversities existed?

— Jenaro Cardona, La esfinge del sendero

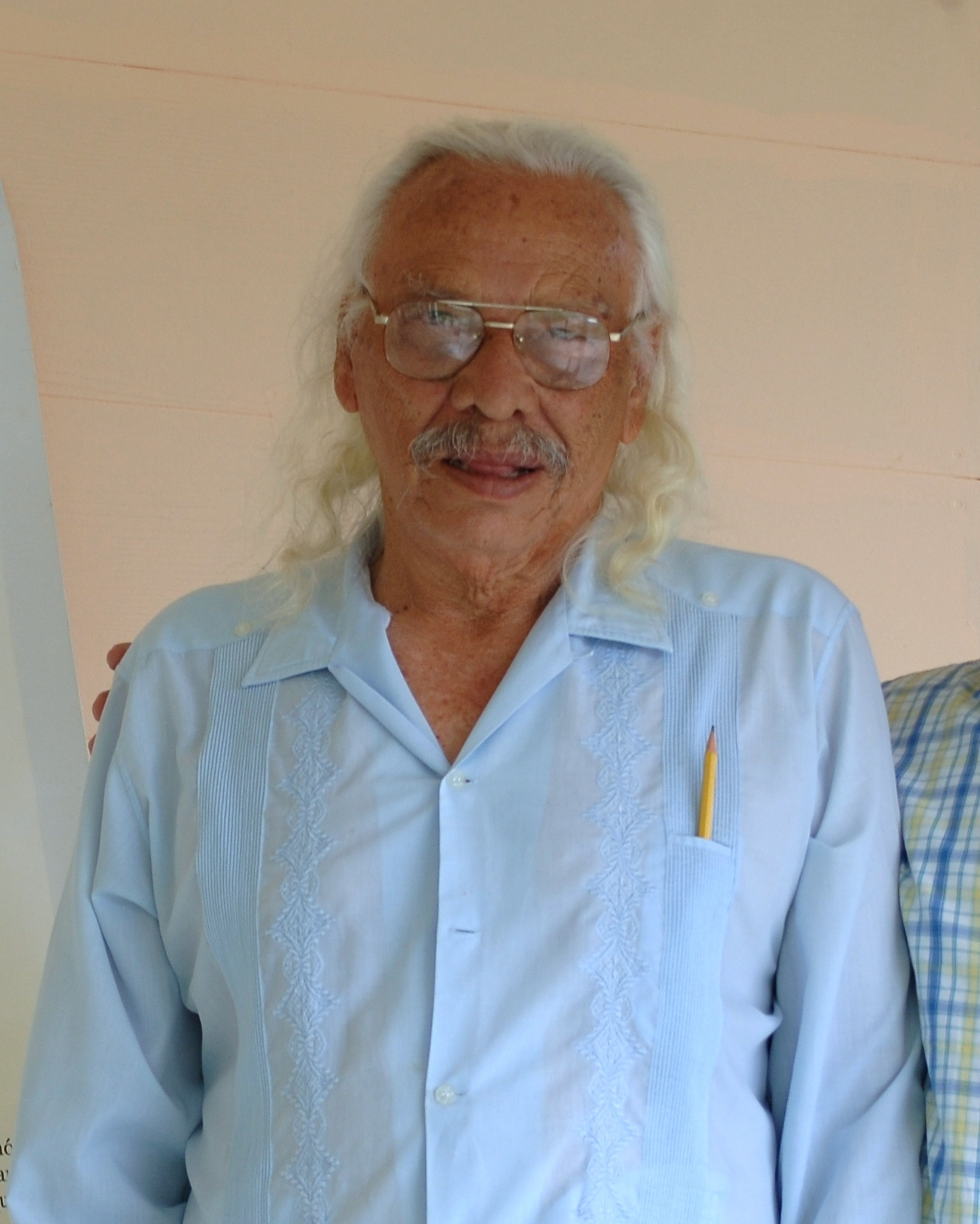
José León Sánchez, author of La isla de los hombres solos (1963).

Homosexuality continued to be portrayed in Costa Rican literature as a byproduct of "social decomposition" in the following decades. In 1963, José León Sánchez published the novel La isla de los hombres solos, which also depicts homosexuality in a negative tone, although in a slightly more humanized way. La isla de los hombres solos was written while León was imprisoned at the San Lucas Island penitentiary and describes the experiences of the inmates there, with extensive details about the same-sex sexual activity that took place at night. The narrator, who details in particular the transvestism and promiscuity among the inmates, does not participate in these encounters and refers to them quite negatively, calling them "vice" and "the disgusting scourge of prisons." Despite the negative tone, the novel opened a social debate in Costa Rica about homosexuality that would influence the decriminalization of homosexuality in 1971.

Costa Rican literary representation of sexual diversity saw a notable change with the introduction of Alfonso Chase, the first Costa Rican writer to publicly declare his homosexuality. From his earliest works, such as the short novel Los juegos furtivos (1968), Chase began to portray protagonists who felt misunderstood in oppressive family and social environments. LGBTQ+ themes became explicit in his short story collection Mirar con inocencia (1973), which included stories such as El hilo del viento, which depicts the love between two boys and the tragedy that occurs when the protagonist's older brothers become jealous of their connection. Chase continued to address homosexuality in his later works, most notably Cara de santo, uñas de gato (1999), a collection of stories half of which deal with homoerotic themes; as well as in his poetry, of which the work Los pies sobre la tierra (1978) stands out. This collection of poems is characterized by its sensual and tender descriptions of the human body, as can be seen in the following excerpt from the poem Sobre los ángeles:

For a long time I ran from the angels.
From the splendor of their timeless young manhood
And that knowing if they were with the living
Or barely living with the dead. Drawn by my gaze,
Or by the breath of my mouth, I have loved them quietly
And I hid from the splendor of their gallantry,
Bravely displayed in the streets, parks
Or bars.

— Alfonso Chase, Sobre los ángeles

The 1980s were characterized by the publication of several high-profile LGBTQ+ works, such as the play Punto de referencia (1983) by Daniel Gallegos, which depicts a love triangle between two men and a woman, whom the latter subsequently bears the child that both men seek to raise; the short story collection La mujer oculta (1984) by José Ricardo Chaves, which included three homoerotic stories and won the Young Creation award from Editorial Costa Rica; the poetry collection I'm even afraid to say it (1987), by Nidia Barboza, the first known lesbian poetry work in the country; and the book The Formation of a Counterculture (1989), by Jacobo Shifter, one of the only Costa Rican LGBTQ+ books of non-fiction.

The arrival of the HIV epidemic in Costa Rica was accompanied by an increase in the persecution of LGBTQ+ people by authorities. Repercussions of this was seen in literary works such as Tiempos del sida: Relatos de la vida real (1989), in which AIDS is presented as a punishment for the "sins" of each of the protagonists. Homosexuality, in particular, is described by Francis as a "harmful lifestyle," a "precipice," and a "fashion" for which the characters must pay by becoming carriers of the disease.

During the 1990s, José Ricardo Chaves replaced Alfonso Chase as the main author of Costa Rican LGBTQ literature. In 1994, Chaves published the novel Los susurros de Perseo, which featured gay and transgender characters in a variety of settings and situations, from youthful sexual initiation to interactions in religious institutions, brothels, and homes. Chaves's next novel, Paisaje con tumbas pintadas en rosa (1998), is considered one of the most realistic depictions of Costa Rica's gay scene in the late 1900s. The plot, which is accentuated by historical events such as the Sandinista Revolution and the visit of Pope John Paul II to Costa Rica, follows the story of a middle-class gay man named Oscar who begins a romantic relationship with a teacher named Mario in San José. However, everything changes with the arrival of HIV, which leads to widespread homophobic hatred and repression and results in the deaths of Mario and many of Oscar's friends.

Unlike the work of Myriam Francis, Paisaje con tumbas pintadas en rosa offers an empathetic and political look at what the HIV/AIDS epidemic meant in Costa Rica, which in the novel is presented in an apocalyptic way given the havoc it caused in the homosexual population in the 1980s. The shadow of death appears even before the virus reaches Oscar, who after consuming a psilocybin mushroom has a hallucination that shows a mist monster as a metaphor representing the tragedy that was coming:

Oscar, frightened, wanted to scream and call out to Javier, but he couldn't move a single muscle; his gaze was fixed on the misty giant. And then the colossus grew hungry, and, in a Goya-esque way, he bent down, plunged his hands into the misty waters, and, at random, began to pull men from the depths of the valley. Some screamed as they were lost in its smoky jaws. And in each of those who died, Oscar recognized a part of his own face.

— José Ricardo Chaves, Paisaje con tumbas pintadas en rosa

Another paradigmatic text of Costa Rican LGBTQ+ literature from the end of the 1900s was the short story Bienvenido a tu nueva vida, published by Uriel Quesada in 1999 in the magazine Áncora. The plot of the story, which recounts the story of a boy on a train who meets a newly married English couple and then receives oral sex from the English man, generated controversy after its publication.

== 2000s ==
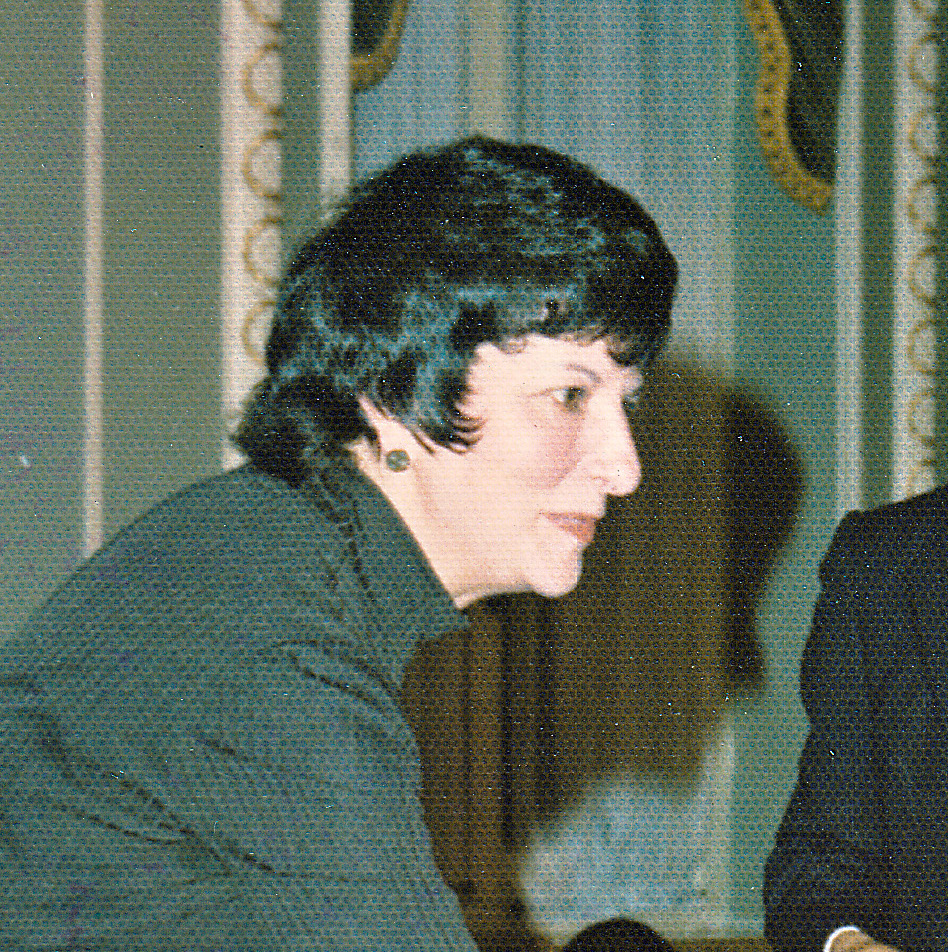
Carmen Naranjo, author of the novel Más allá del Parismina (2000).

The 2000s began with the publication of Más allá del Parismina (2000), a novel by writer Carmen Naranjo and in which she addresses lesbianism through the story of Isabel, a woman who flees due to gender violence to a mythical land by crossing the Parismina River and ends up finding a female partner. Years earlier, Naranjo had explored sexual transition in her story Simbiosis del encuentro (1988), where a heterosexual couple who had lost their passion discover that the woman was transitioning into a man and the man into a woman, which causes the husband to become pregnant.

Other works with LGBTQ+ themes that appeared in the early 2000s include the novels Amor en la selva (2000) by Eduardo Saxe Fernández, as well as El más violento paraíso (2001) and Canciones a la muerte de los niños (2005) by Alexánder Obando, who is also known for having edited the Costa Rican LGBTQ+ fiction anthology La gruta y el arcoíris (2008), the first compilation of LGBTQ+ literature in Central America. José Otilio Umaña, for his part, is recognized for the short story collections Bailando en solitario (2008) and Cosas de hombres (2009), both focused on the lives of LGBTQ+ characters.

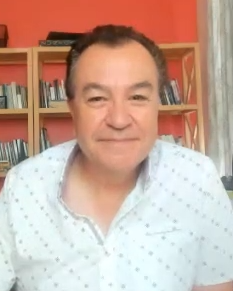
Uriel Quesada, author of El gato de sí mismo (2005).

Uriel Quesada continued to position himself with works such as the collection of stories Lejos, tan lejos (2004) and the novel El gato de sí mismo (2005), considered one of his most notable works and winner of the Aquileo J Echeverría National Prize. The plot follows, as an autobiography, the life of Germán Germanóvich, a boy whose thoughts mix reality with fantasy and who leaves his home for Santa Cruz to escape his father's rejection and falls in love with a boy named Íñigo. Quesada was also one of the editors of the English-language work Queer Brown Voices (2015), which brings together testimonies from LGBTQ+ activists from different countries in Latin America.

The interest in rescuing the history of Costa Rican populations belonging to the LGBTQ+ community was reflected in the publication of two novels that reproduced the life of these communities during the last years of the 20th century: Como una candela al viento (2009), by Sebastián Rojo, and Impudicas pasiones. Una historia de amor diferente (2011), by Julián A. Garner, both signed under pseudonyms.

Testimonial literature has been represented in recent years by works such as Atrevidas. Relatos polifónicos de mujeres trans (2019), a book of short stories in which the writer Camila Schumacher reproduced the stories told to her by transgender women belonging to the Transvida collective. The work was awarded the Aquileo J Echeverría National Prize in the short story category in its 2019 edition.

== See also ==
- LGBTQ rights in Costa Rica
- LGBTQ literature in Mexico
- LGBTQ literature in Guatemala
- LGBTQ literature in El Salvador

== Bibliographies ==
- Carrasco, Candide (2003). "Voces gay en la narrativa costarricense". Letras (in Spanish): 81–101. doi:10.15359/rl.1-35.6. ISSN 2215-4094. Archived from the original on 2016-11-08.
- Velásquez, Antonio (2015). "Miradas sobre la representación de la homosexualidad en la literatura centroamericana y el caso de Trágame tierra" [Perspectives on the representation of homosexuality in Central American literature and the case of Trágame tierra]. The Latin Americanist. 59 (2): 51–66. ISSN 1557-203X.
