= Yolanda Oreamuno =

Costa Rican writer

Yolanda Oreamuno Unger
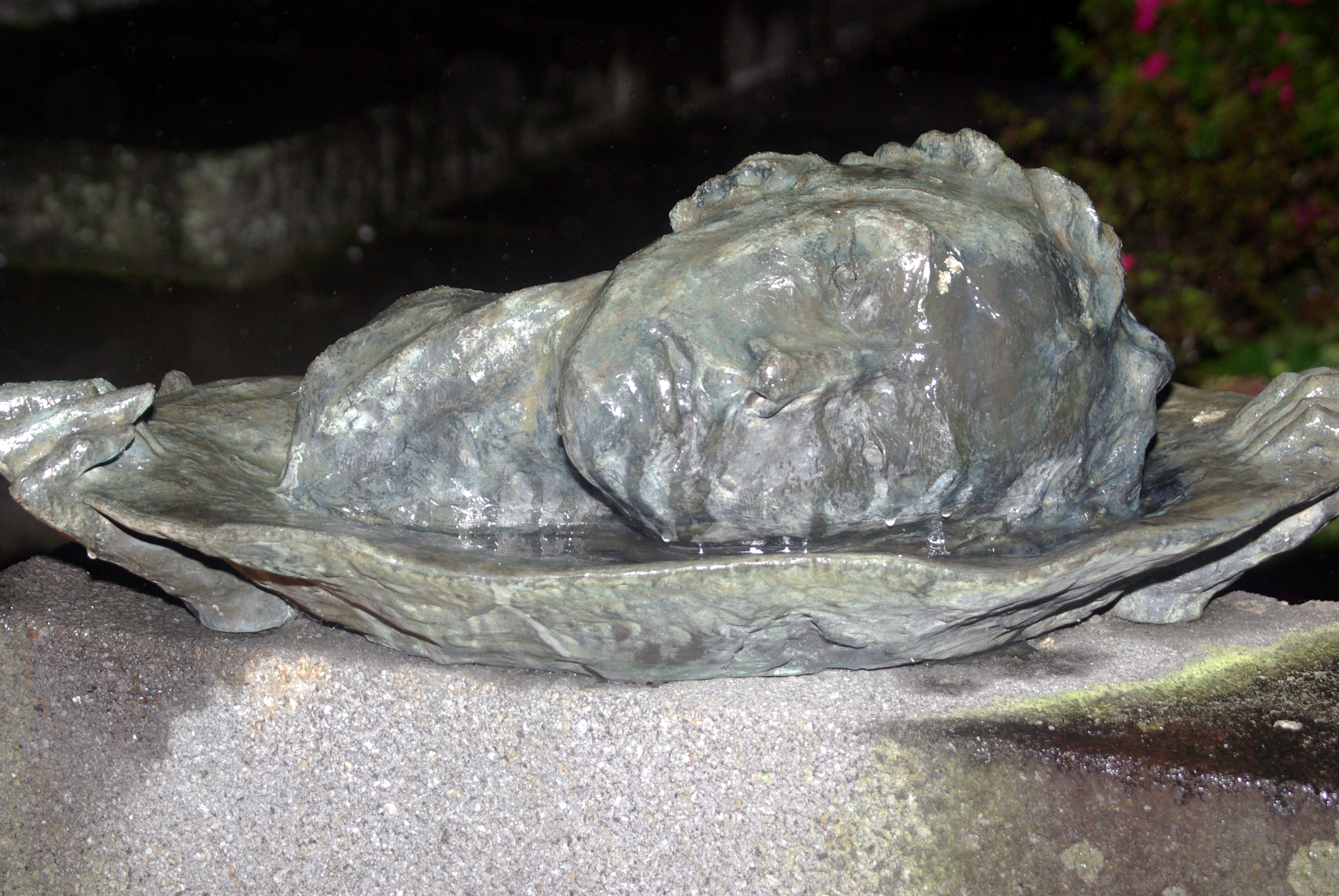
- Sculpture of Yolanda Oreamuno, by Marisel Jiménez, in the garden of el Teatro Nacional
- Born: 8 April 1916; San Jose, Costa Rica
- Died: 8 July 1956 (aged 40); Mexico City, Mexico

Yolanda Oreamuno Unger (8 April 1916 – 8 July 1956) was a Costa Rican writer. Her most acclaimed novel is La Ruta de su Evasión (1948). Her 40 years of life were markedly divided into two phases: the first 20 years, filled with youth, beauty and happiness, contrasted sharply with the following years of tragedy, loneliness and sickness.

== Early life ==
Yolanda Oreamuno was the only child of Carlos Oreamuno Pacheco and Margarita Unger Salazar. Her father died before her first birthday, so she was mainly raised by her maternal grandmother, Eudoxia Salazar Salazar, whose husband Unger was deceased by then. She obtained her secondary education in the Colegio Superior de Señoritas. She then studied bookkeeping and worked at the Costa Rican Post Office headquarters.

At the age of 20 she published her first two stories, "La lagartija de la panza blanca" and "Para Revenar, no para Max Jiménez".

== Marriage and adult life ==
She was working in the Chilean embassy when she met the diplomat Jorge Molina Wood. They were married, and moved to that country. She recounted life during that time in her stories La mareas vuelven de noche and Don Junvencio (which remained unpublished until 1971). Her time in Chile was prolific; her stories appeared in Repertorio Americano, including 40º sobre cero, 18 de setiembre, Misa de ocho, Vela urbana, El espíritu de mi tierra, Insomnio and El negro, sentido de la alegría. Their marriage, however, fell apart in 1936; her husband, weakened by an incurable disease, committed suicide. She returned to Costa Rica at the end of 1936.

In 1937 she married a lawyer, Óscar Barahona Streber, who was involved with the Costa Rican communist movement. They both participated in opposition activities. Their son, Sergio Barahona Oreamuno, was born 21 September 1942. Their marriage did not last; after their divorce, her ex-husband migrated to Guatemala.

She wrote her first novel, Por tierra firme, in 1938. In 1940 she submitted it to a writing contest, winning a three-way first prize. However, she declined to share the honor with the others, and decided against sending the manuscript for publication; eventually the manuscript was lost.

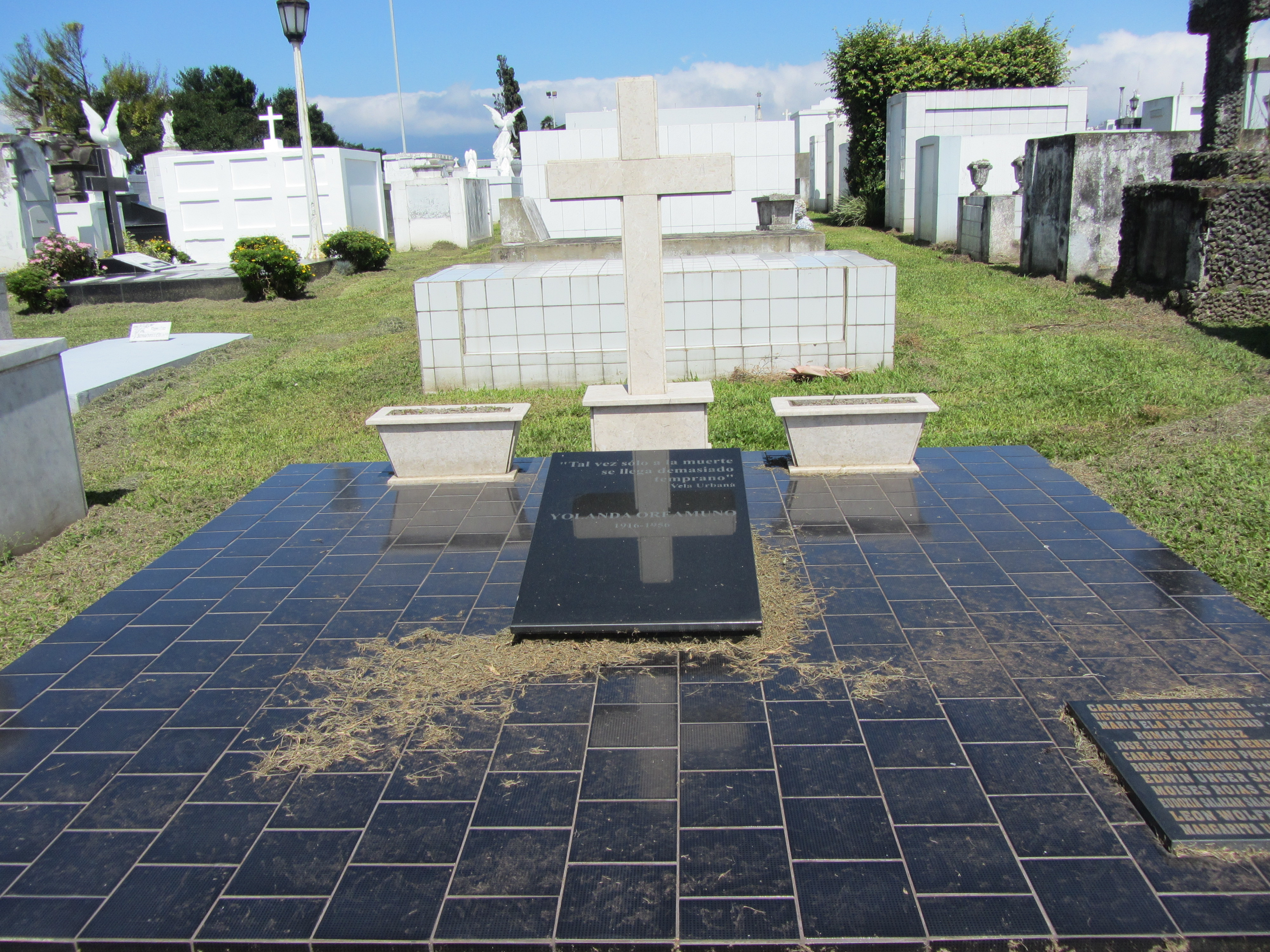
Oreamuno's tomb. The epitaph reads "Tal vez solo a la muerte se llega demasiado temprano" (perhaps only in death was she too early)

Oreamuno moved to Mexico, then decided to become a permanent Guatemalan citizen. However, by 1949 she was gravely ill, and she dwelt four months in a Washington D. C. hospital. She left the hospital to travel to Mexico City, to stay in the house of Costa Rican poet Eunice Odio. She died there in 1956. She was buried in a mausoleum in San Joaquín, D.F. In 1963 her remains were moved to San José. On the 55th anniversary of her death (8 July 2011), a commemorative plaque was installed over her tomb.

== Literary work ==
=== Novels ===
- Por tierra firme (text lost)
- La ruta de su evasión, first-place winner of the concurso Centroamericano de Novela, hosted by the Guatemalan Ministerio de Educación Pública (1948)

=== Other works ===
- A lo largo del corto camino, collection of essays, criticisms, and stories, with four chapters of La ruta de su evasión. Editorial Costa Rica, colección Biblioteca de Autores Costarricenses (1961)

== Stories or articles published ==
- Vela urbana, Repertorio Americano, San José (March 1937)
- Misa de ocho, Repertorio Americano, San José (1937)
- 40º sobre cero (in Panamá), Repertorio Americano (1937)
- La lagartija de la panza blanca (Un cuento para hombres-niños de imaginación grande), dedicated to the painter Teodorico Quirós
- El espíritu de mi tierra, San José (August 1937)
- Apología del limón dulce y el paisaje, Repertorio Americano, Bogotá, Colombia (March 1944)
- México es mío, en Repertorio Americano, México (December 1944)
- El negro, sentido de la alegría
- Dos tormentas y una aurora (1944)
- Casta sombría (1944)
- Pasajeros al norte, en Repertorio Americano, México (September 1944)
- José de la Cruz recoge su muerte
- Un regalo, Repertorio Americano, México (July 1948)
- Valle Alto, Brecha (December 1958)

== Evaluation of her work ==
Her most renowned novel is La Ruta de su Evasión (1948). Oreamuno draws on narrative techniques that were uncommon in other Costa Rican writers. It is believed that authors like Thomas Mann and Marcel Proust influenced her literary creation. Costa Rican critic Abelardo Bonilla wrote that "In this as in all works of Yolanda Oreamuno there is boldness of conception and form, but there is a lack of internal unity".
