= Fabián Dobles =

Costa Rican politician and writer (1918–1997)

- Born: Fabián Dobles Rodríguez; 17 January 1918; San Antonio de Belén, Heredia, Costa Rica
- Died: 22 March 1997 (aged 79); San Isidro de Heredia, Costa Rica
- Education: Universidad de Costa Rica
- Occupations: Writer, teacher, lawyer, administrator, journalist, politician
- Spouse: Cecilia Trejos
- Writing career
- Language: Spanish
- Period: 1942–1989
- Genres: Novels, short stories, poems
- Notable works: Ese que llaman pueblo (1943), Historias de Tata Mundo, (1955), En el San Juan hay tiburón (1967), Los años, pequeños días (1989)
- Notable awards: Aquileo J. Echeverría National Prize for Literature, novel category (1967); Magón National Prize for Culture (1968)
- Literary movement: '40s Generation

Fabián Dobles Rodríguez (January 17, 1918 – March 22, 1997) was a Costa Rican writer and left-wing political activist. An author of novels, short stories, poems, and essays, he earned international recognition as an author dealing with the plight of the poor and with social protest. Dobles is considered one of the most important writers in what critics have identified as the "'40s generation" (Generación del 40) of Costa Rican literature. He was also an active militant in the Communist Party of Costa Rica.

== Family background and early life ==
Fabián Dobles was the eighth of the eleven children (ten of whom survived into adulthood) of Miguel Dobles and Carmen Rodríguez, both from traditional families settled in the city of Heredia, Costa Rica. Miguel Dobles was a physician educated at New York University (M.D., 1895) who worked as a country doctor and general practitioner, employed by the Costa Rican government. Fabián was born in the small town of San Antonio de Belén in 1918. The family soon resettled in the rural community of Atenas, in the province of Alajuela, were Fabián would grow up.

Doctor Dobles was a very strict and devout Roman Catholic who had intended that his son Fabían prepare for the priesthood. However, a series of incidents, which he would later fictionalize in his last novel, Los años, pequeños días ("Years Like Brief Days" published in 1989), led Fabián to abandon that career path and to study law at the University of Costa Rica. At an early age, he saw some of his poetry published in Joaquín García Monge's influential literary magazine Repertorio Americano ("American Repertoire").

== Political involvement ==
Active in left-wing political causes from his student days, Fabián Dobles eventually became a leading figure in the Communist Party of Costa Rica. In the 1940s, the Costa Rican communists were allied to the governments of Presidents Rafael Ángel Calderón Guardia and Teodoro Picado Michalski, helping to pass the country's first modern social welfare legislation. During this time, Dobles found employment in the legal department of the state's Child Welfare Agency, and later in the division for savings and subsidies of the Costa Rican Social Security Fund. He also taught social work at the University of Costa Rica.

Following the defeat of the government in the Costa Rican Civil War of 1949, the Communist Party was outlawed and Dobles spent time in prison. After his release, he had difficulty obtaining employment and over the years worked delivering milk, selling blankets, and as an administrator for a lumber depot and for a factory of doors and windows. A new "Socialist Party" attempted to run Dobles as its presidential candidate in the 1958 elections, but the government prevented the party from registering.

Dobles eventually found employment as an English teacher at the Liceo de Costa Rica (a public secondary school in San José). He was a correspondent for Novosti, the Soviet international press agency, and for Prensa Latina, the official state news agency of Cuba. He also worked for the Costa Rican state publisher, Editorial Costa Rica, eventually becoming one of its directors.

== Literary production and recognition ==
Dobles published eighteen books, including eight novels, seven collections of short stories, and three volumes of poetry. For his literary work, he was awarded the Magón National Prize for Culture by the Costa Rican government, the nation's highest award for cultural work, in 1968. Some of the short stories in the collection Historias de Tata Mundo ("Tales of Daddy World") were anthologized by UNESCO and translated into several languages. The press of the University of Costa Rica and the press of the National University of Costa Rica jointly published his collected works in five volumes in 1993. In 1994 he was elected as member of the Costa Rican Academy of Language.

With some exceptions (including his last novel, Los años, pequeños días, which is essentially autobiographical), Dobles's literary work is mainly concerned with the struggle for subsistence of simple peasants in rural Costa Rica, or else, notably in Ese que llaman pueblo ("The So-Called People"), with the plight of the urban proletariat. Most of this work may be classified as belonging to social realism, and Dobles himself regarded his literary output as integral to his political militancy. The novel En el San Juan hay tiburón ("There are sharks in the San Juan River", published in 1967), dealt with the armed struggle of the Sandinista National Liberation Front against the Somoza dictatorship in Nicaragua.

According to Prof. Edward Waters Hood, a specialist in Latin American literature at Northern Arizona University, Dobles was "one of Central America's best known novelists", whose novels reflected a concern with "the conflict between tradition and change, and the search for an individual and national identity."

== Death ==
Fabián Dobles died in his home in San Isidro de Heredia, at the age of 79. He lived with his wife Cecilia Trejos, whom he had married in 1942, and by the couple's five daughters.

== Works ==
- Aguas turbias, novel, Editorial Letras Nacionales, San José, 1942
- Ese que llaman pueblo, novel, Talleres Gráficos Trejos Hermanos, San José, 1943
- Tú, voz de sombra, poetry, Editorial Letras Nacionales, San José, 1945
- Una burbuja en el limbo, novel, Editorial L'Atélier, San José, 1946
- La rescoldera, story, Editorial L'Atélier, San José, 1947
- Verdad del agua y del viento, poetry, Editorial del Ministerio de Educación Pública, Guatemala, 1949
- El sitio de las abras, novel, Editorial del Ministerio de Educación Pública, Guatemala, 1950
- Antes que nada, story, 1952
- Historias de Tata Mundo, 25 stories, Talleres Gráficos Trejos Hermanos, San José, 1955
- El jaspe, story, Editorial Aurora Social, San José, 1956
- El maijú y otras historias, stories, Talleres Gráficos Trejos Hermanos, San José, 1957
- El targuá, stories, 1960
- Los leños vivientes, novel, Editorial Costa Rica, 1962
- Yerbamar, sonnets, with Mario Picado, Tormo, San José, 1965
- La Barrilete, theatre, 1965
- El violín y la chatarra, stories, Presbere, San Jos 1966
- En el San Juan hay tiburón, novel, Editorial L'Atélier, San José, 1967
- Cuentos de Fabián Dobles, collected stories, Editorial Universitaria Centroamericana, San José, 1971
- Cuentos escogidos, selected stories, Editorial Educativa Costarricense, 1982
- La pesadilla y otros cuentos, stories, Editorial Costa Rica, 1984
- Los años pequeños días, novel, Editorial Costa Rica, 1989
- Obras completas, complete works in five volumes, Editorial de la Universidad de Costa Rica, 1993
- "¡Alerta Ustedes!", essay, La Nación, 1993

== Works available in English ==
- Years Like Brief Days, novel, translated by Joan Henry, Peter Owen Publishers ISBN 978-0-7206-0987-5
- The Stories of Tata Mundo, short stories, translated by Joan Henry, Editorial De La Universidad De Costa Rica ISBN 978-9-9776-7505-3

== Sources ==
- Ann B. González, Sí Pero No: Fabián Dobles and the Postcolonial Challenge, Fairleigh Dickinson University Press, 2005 ISBN 0-8386-4051-6, ISBN 978-0-8386-4051-7

== See also ==
- Costa Rican literature
