= José Cañas (disambiguation) =

José Cañas (born 1987) is a Spanish professional footballer

José Cañas may also refer to:

- José María Cañas (1809–1860), Salvadoran military figure
- José Marín Cañas (1904–1980), Costa Rican novelist, playwright, travel writer, and journalist
