= Carlos Cortés =

Carlos Cortés may refer to:

- Carlos Cortés Díaz (1923–1971), Chilean trade unionist and politician
- Carlos Cortés (footballer) (born 2001), Colombian footballer
- Carlos Cortés Navarrete (born 1978), Mexican sound engineer
- Carlos Cortés Silva (1895–1963), Chilean farmer and politician
- Carlos Cortés Vargas (1883–1954), Colombian army general, ordered the 1928 Banana Massacre
- Carlos Cortés Zúñiga (born 1962), Costa Rican novelist, poet, and essayist
- Carlos E. Cortés (born 1934), U.S. historian and media specialist

== See also ==
- Carlos Cortes (born 1997), Puerto Rican and American baseball player
- Carlos Cortez (1923–2005), American artist and activist
