= Nidia Barboza =

Nidia Barboza Mesén (born 1954), sometimes spelled Nidya Barboza, is a Costa Rican poet and feminist activist. Her work is considered an early example of lesbian literature in Costa Rica.

== Early life and education ==
Nidia Barboza was born in 1954 in San José, Costa Rica. In high school, she studied at the Colegio Nuestra Señora de los Desamparados.

== Career ==
=== Writing ===
Barboza began writing and publishing poetry as a teenager, and her work has appeared in various Costa Rican publications. She has also written short fiction and worked for Editorial Costa Rica in its cultural promotion department.

She is considered a notable member of a generation of young female poets who entered the Costa Rican literary scene in the 1970s. In 1976, with Rodolfo Dada and others, she co-founded the literary group known as Grupo Oruga, intended as an alternative to the more establishment Círculo de Escritores Costarricenses. She was also linked to the Grupo Sin Nombre.

In 1980, she published her first collection of poetry, Las voces: Nidos en las orejas el aire. It was released in a joint volume with the work of fellow young poet Gerardo Morales García. The collection had won a Premio Joven Creación, a prize for young authors in Costa Rica, two years earlier, leading to its publication.

Her subsequent poetry collection, Hasta me da miedo decirclo, was published in 1987. Hasta me da miedo decirlo has been described as the first book of poetry firmly in the area of lesbian literature to be published in Costa Rica. The poems in Barboza's collection feature two clearly female figures expressing their love.

She later said she chose to write openly about lesbianism in order to push back on her closed-off society and to show her peers that they did not need to hide their own feelings. Due to a conservative environment, the book's readership in Costa Rica was limited, though it reached a wider audience abroad.

Barboza's poetry has been featured in such anthologies as Antología de una generación dispersa (1982), Canto abierto: asamblea de poetas (1983), Antología crítica de la poesía de Costa Rica (1992), Indómitas voces: las poetas de Costa Rica (1994), and El amor en la poesía costarricense (2000).

=== Activism ===
Barboza is also known for her involvement as a feminist activist in Costa Rica, including through working for the Costa Rican Feminist Information and Action Center (CEFEMINA).
