= Nico Assumpção =

Brazilian musician (1954–2001)

Nico Assumpção (Antônio Álvaro Assumpção Neto) (August 13, 1954 – January 20, 2001), was a Brazilian bass player.

== Biography ==
He was born Antônio Álvaro Assumpção Neto in São Paulo, Brazil, in 1954. His father was a professional bass player, but Nico debuted in music by playing the acoustic guitar at the age of 10, having classes with Paulinho Nogueira. He changed to bass at 16, to fill in the void in a schoolmate's band.

At age of 16, he went to the U.S. to study harmony and orchestration at the University of California. Back in Brazil he went to study at CLAM, with famous Brazilian bassists Luis Chaves and Amilton Godoy. Later, in 1976, he again left Brazil and headed to New York City, willing to study and perform with his instrument at a deeper level. There, he played with several important musicians of the jazz scene, including Wayne Shorter, Pat Metheny, Sadao Watanabe, Larry Coryell, Fred Hersh, Larry Willis, Joe Diorio, John Hicks, Steve Slagle, Victor Lewis, Dom Salvador and Charlie Rouse.

In the US, he mastered various bass playing techniques, being one of the pioneers of fretless and 6-string bass in Brazil when he came back on 1981, the same year in which he released the first bassist solo album in the country, titled "Nico Assumpção". In 1982 he moved to Rio de Janeiro, where he lived for the rest of his life, and turned into one of the most popular bassists of the country among musicians and artists for recording and shows, having played and/or recorded with Milton Nascimento, Caetano Veloso, Gilberto Gil, João Bosco, Maria Bethânia, Edu Lobo, César Camargo Mariano, Toninho Horta, Luiz Avellar, Wauke Wakabaiashi, Marco Pereira, Ricardo Silveira, Nelson Faria, Gal Costa, Hélio Delmiro, Maria Bethânia, Márcio Montarroyos, Raphael Rabello, Léo Gandelman and Victor Biglione, among others.

The bassist died in Rio de Janeiro at age 47, a cancer victim.

== Discography ==
- Nico Assumpção 1981 Brazil
- Luiz Avellar, Nico Assumpção e Kiko Freitas tocando Victor Assis Brasil 2000 Brazil
- Nico Assumpção, Nelson Faria, Lincoln Cheib Três/Three 2000 Brazil
