= Javier Rodríguez =

Javier Rodríguez may refer to:

- Javier Rodríguez (artist) (born 1972), Spanish comics artist
- Javier Rodríguez (sport shooter) (born 1964), Mexican sport shooter
- Javi Rodríguez (futsal player) (born 1974), Spanish futsal player
- Javier Rodríguez Pérez (born 1979), Spanish basketball player, see 2007–08 ACB season
- Javier Rodríguez Venta (born 1975), Spanish former football right-back
- Javier Pascual Rodríguez (born 1971), former Spanish cyclist
- Javier Rodríguez Mayorga, Ecuadorian football manager of the Ecuador national under-17 football team
- Javi Rodríguez (footballer) (born 2003), Spanish football right-back for Celta
- Javier Rodriguez, a character in Traffic (2000 film)

== See also ==
- Francisco Javier Rodríguez (born 1981), Mexican footballer
- Francisco Javier Rodriguez (disambiguation)
