= San Lucas Island =

National Park on an island off the Pacific coast of Costa Rica in the Gulf of Nicoya

San Lucas Island National Park
- Parque Nacional Isla San Lucas
- IUCN category II (national park)
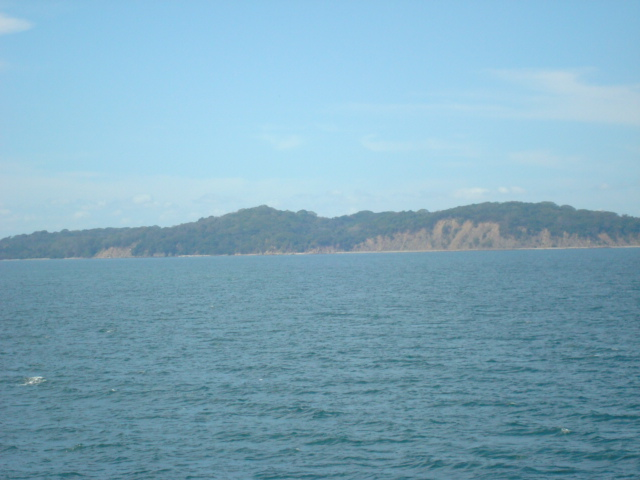
- San Lucas as seen from the Gulf of Nicoya
- San Lucas Island National Park area.
- Location: Costa Rica
- Coordinates: 9.939°N 84.906°W
- Area: 4.49 square kilometres (1.73 sq mi) (terrestrial), 9.95 square kilometres (3.84 sq mi) (marine)
- Established: 24 August 2020
- Governing body: National System of Conservation Areas (SINAC)
- Location in Costa Rica

San Lucas Island National Park (Spanish: Parque Nacional Isla San Lucas) is an island located off the Pacific shore of Costa Rica in the Gulf of Nicoya. It is part of the Puntarenas district in the canton and province of the same name.

Formerly housing a brutal prison, now abandoned, the island was designated as a National Park in August 2020 by decree 9892 and managed under the Central Pacific Conservation Area.

== Toponymy ==
Named for Luke the Evangelist.

== Geography ==
San Lucas Island located in the Gulf of Nicoya off the Pacific coast of Costa Rica, about 40 minutes by boat from Puntarenas. The island has an area of approximately 4.6 km^{2} (1.8 sq mi)

== Indigenous culture ==
Indigenous groups lived on San Lucas and the surrounding islands. There are eight known archeological sites on the island, including apparent houses where stone tools and a metal object were found in the late 1970s. The excavation sites date to between 1,000 and 1,500 AD.

== Prison ==
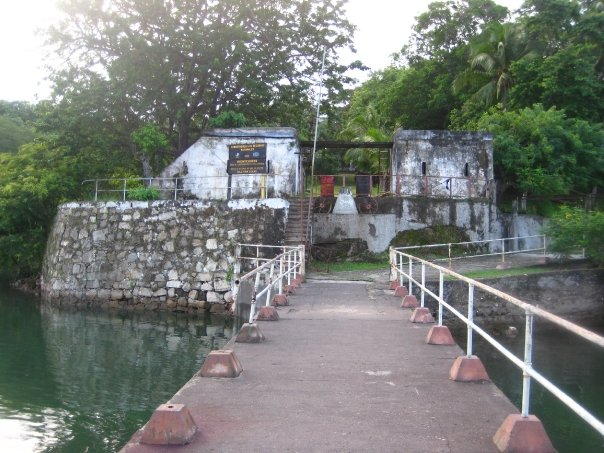
Main dock and administrative offices, 2008

From 1873 to 1991, San Lucas Island was a penal island for some of the worst criminals in Costa Rica. It is often erroneously cited as the largest prison in Costa Rican history. It was founded by the dictator Tomás Miguel Guardia Gutiérrez. Being sent to San Lucas Island was a terrible prospect as prisoners' lives were short and often spent in torture. Ironically, Guardia abolished the death penalty a year after establishing the prison.

The former buildings of the penal island are considered "Patrimonio de Cultura", or cultural heritage sites. The buildings include a historic dock that is still in use after the first dock was destroyed, a church, a medical building, temporary holding cells, a three-story main office, a large concrete disc used to hold a water tank, and water pumps. In addition, there are prison cells of varying security levels depending on the prisoners' crimes. The prison cells contain the typical graffiti of older Latin American prisons, such as religious phrases, pornographic images, signatures and drawings. There are also several water pumps and a cemetery under excavation on the island.

José León Sánchez, a prisoner of the island, wrote La Isla de Hombres Solos, translated into English as "The Island of Lonely Men", based on his time in the prison at San Lucas Island. León claimed that he was unjustly imprisoned for a murder that he did not commit. Other prisoners included Beltrán Cortés Carvajal, the famous killer of the doctors Carlos Manuel Echandi Lahmann and Ricardo Moreno Cañas.

== National Park ==
It was first designated as a Wildlife Refuge as created in 2002 by decree 29277-MINAE.

On August 10, 2020, it was designated as the 30th National Park of Costa Rica by record 21287 of the Legislative Assembly and also as a Historical-Architectural Heritage (Spanish: Patrimonio Histórico-Arquitectónico) by record 21789.

=== Wildlife ===
The island includes a wide variety of wildlife, such as howler monkeys, spiders, snakes, deer, and pheasants. There are also at least 8 species of bats on the island. The waters surrounding the island are home to hammerhead sharks, rays, and turtles.

=== Tourism ===
The Instituto Costarricense de Turismo began planning to invest money into tourism on the island by developing commercial spaces for restaurants, beaches, and tour operators. The volunteer organization Raleigh International occasionally sends young volunteers to help rangers clear beaches to make the island more attractive for tourism.

Now it is a full-fledged tourist destination, with several companies offering charters to the island.

There are plans to develop more sustainable tourist activities on the island.

=== Volunteer work ===
The island benefits from volunteers of the charity Raleigh International, who work with the rangers on the island to improve the surrounding area.

== See also ==
- Alcatraz Island, former island prison in California, United States.
- Asinara, former island prison in Italy.
- Cellular Jail, former island prison in India.
- Château d'If, former island prison in France.
- Devil's Island, former island prison in French Guiana.
- Fort Denison, former island prison in Australia.
- Robben Island, former island prison in South Africa.
