= Beltrán Cortés =

Costa Rican murderer (1908–1984)

Beltrán Cortés Carvajal
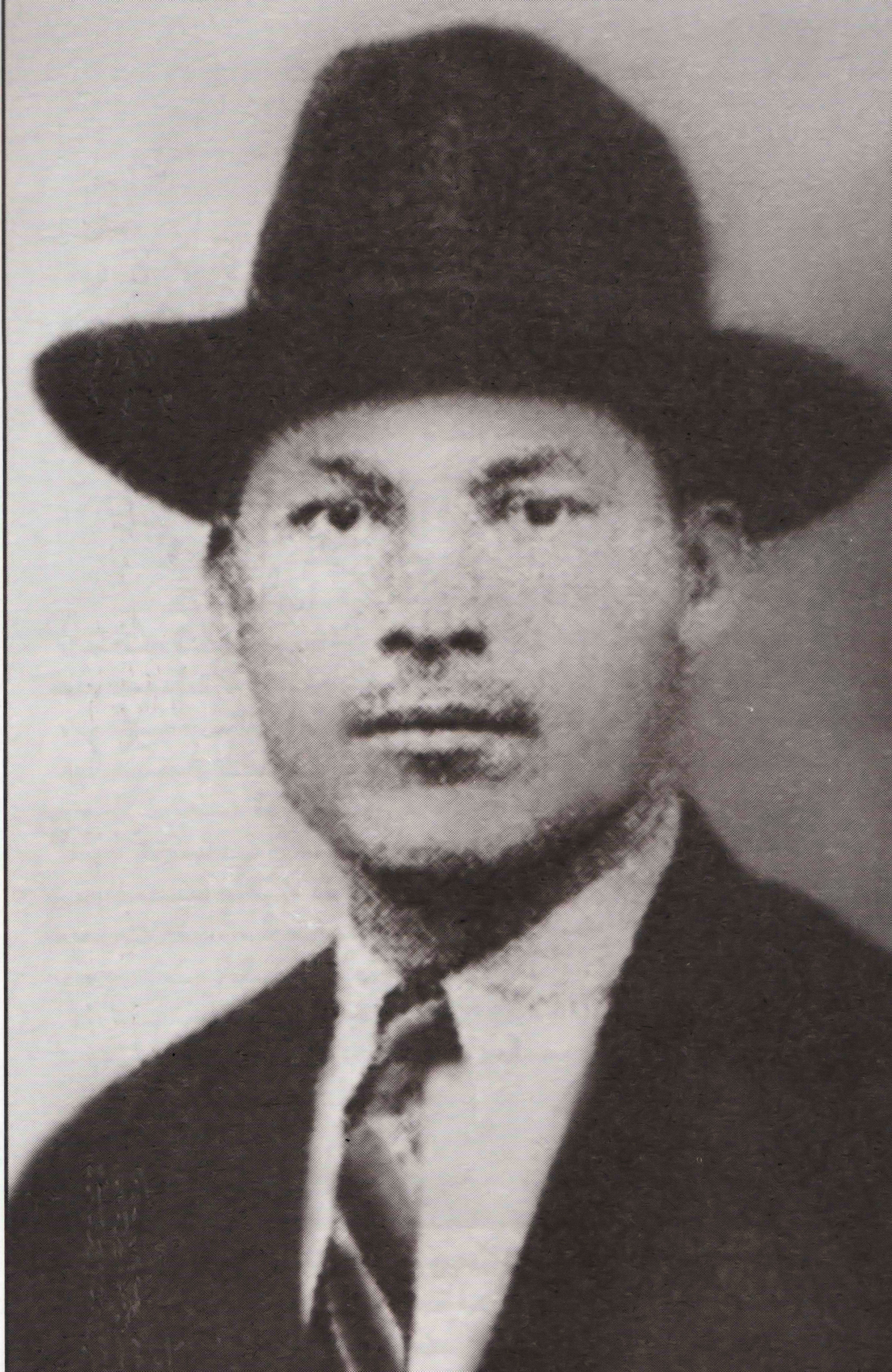
- Born: 21 November 1908; Santa Bárbara, Costa Rica
- Died: 11 June 1984 (aged 75); Santa Bárbara, Costa Rica
- Conviction: Murder
- Penalty: 32 years imprisonment

Details
- Victims: 4
- Span of crimes: 1934–1938
- Country: Costa Rica
- Date apprehended: 23 August 1938

Beltrán Dalay Cortés Carvajal (21 November 1908 – 11 June 1984) was a convicted Costa Rican murderer, mostly known for the murders of the physicians Ricardo Moreno Cañas and Carlos Echandi. He is one of the most famous former prisoners of San Lucas Island.

== Family and early years ==
Beltrán Cortés was born on 12 November 1908, as the youngest of 18 siblings to Rosendo Cortés Madrigal and Amelia Carvajal in Santa Bárbara, Heredia. By 1938, he was living with his mom and three sisters in Santa Bárbara. He finished the first levels of elementary school and then went on to work as a farmer, never getting married or having children. A door accidentally fell on him as a kid in Heredia's central market, which resulted in a head wound that left a permanent scar and a humerus fracture in his right arm that never aligned because it was not properly treated in time.

== The surgeries by Dr. Moreno and Dr. Echandi ==
In 1928, at the age of 20, he had surgery three times by doctors Moreno and Echandi. On 1 June, both doctors surgically wired his right humerus. He had two follow-up surgeries, on 23 July by Dr. Echandi, and on 3 August by Dr. Moreno.

On 2 August 1929, Dr. Moreno gave him metal plate implants. These were extracted on 4 April 1932. At this point, his diagnosis was an unconsolidated humerus due to syphilis.

== Criminal background ==
After the surgeries, he served as a police officer in San Rafael de Heredia. On 28 July 1934, he killed his partner Benjamín Garita Ramírez while on duty. He was convicted to a 5-year sentence on San Lucas Island. He had years taken off his sentence by performing manual labour. When he left prison, he got a job at Chapuí Asylum, which he quickly quit to sell merchandise in the streets.

== The doctors' murders ==
Cortés became obsessed with the failed surgeries over time. At least one doctor told him they had been the surgeons' fault, while an attorney convinced him Dr. Moreno should compensate him for the hardship and pain suffered. Cortés later stated that he had gone to the hospital to get treated for a pain in his leg, and that Dr. Moreno took advantage of this to take a graft of bone from his healthy arm for a foreign patient.

Prior to the murders, he had threatened to kill the two doctors, leading his mother to ask that he be admitted into Chapuí Asylum. Cortés bought a gun from a police officer. On August 23, 1938, at 7:30 pm., he knocked on Dr. Moreno's door. When the maid opened the door, he ran into the living room where Dr. Moreno was reading the newspaper and shot him three times.

He escaped the scene and immediately went to Dr. Echandi's house, stopping along the way to ask for directions. When he got there, he once again knocked on the door and was received by the footman. Dr. Echandi was on his way out, as he had heard on the radio the news of Dr. Moreno's death and wanted to go to the crime scene. Cortés shot him twice from the front gate. Only one of the shots hit him, and the other one bounced off the door.

During his escape, Cortés killed a Canadian man called Arthur Maynard and severely injured two people, by the names of Egérico Vargas Loría and Rodolfo Quirós Quirós, before being apprehended.

== San Lucas Island ==
On 23 June 1938, he was sentenced to a term of undefined length at San Lucas Island. President León Cortés Castro ordered the construction of a two square metre cell for him that would allow visitors to see him. Tourists were brought from Puntarenas up to the island to see him exhibited in this cell. José León Sánchez mentioned him in his book La isla de los hombres solos.

President Otilio Ulate Blanco ordered that he be taken out of that cell and placed with the other prisoners during a visit to the facility. During President José Figueres' administration, the country's penal code was reformed in the early 1970s, limiting Costa Rica's maximum penalty to 30 years in prison. Since Cortés had already been incarcerated for 32 years at this point, he was immediately released. He died of prostate cancer on 11 June 1984, at the age of 75, in his sister's house in Santa Bárbara.
