= Francisco Rodríguez =

Francisco Rodríguez may refer to:

== Sports ==
=== Baseball ===
- Francisco Rodríguez (Mexican pitcher) (born 1983), Mexican League, Tigres de Quintana Roo
- Francisco Rodríguez (Venezuelan pitcher) (born 1982), relief pitcher who is nicknamed "K-Rod"
- Frank Rodriguez (born 1972), pitcher for the Minnesota Twins and Seattle Mariners

=== Boxing ===
- Francisco Rodríguez (boxer, born 1945) (1945–2024), Venezuelan boxer
- Francisco Rodriguez (boxer, born 1984) (1984–2009), American boxer
- Francisco Rodríguez Jr. (born 1993), Mexican boxer

=== Cycling ===
- Francisco Rodríguez (cyclist, born 1906) (1906–?), Argentine cyclist
- Francisco Rodríguez (cyclist, born 1915) (1915–1998), Mexican cyclist
- Francisco Rodríguez Maldonado (born 1960), Colombian cyclist

=== Football ===
- Francisco Rodríguez García (1934–2022), Spanish footballer
- Francisco Rodríguez (Swiss footballer) (born 1995), Swiss footballer
- Francisco (footballer, born 1978) (Francisco Javier Rodríguez, born 1978), Spanish footballer and manager
- Francisco Javier Rodríguez (born 1981), Mexican footballer

=== Other sports ===
- Francisco Rodríguez (Puerto Rican judoka) (born 1970), Puerto Rican Olympic judoka
- Francisco Rodríguez (rower) (born 1953), Cuban Olympic rower
- Francisco Rodríguez (Spanish judoka) (born 1957), Spanish Olympic judoka
- Francisco Rodríguez (tennis) (born 1976), Paraguayan tennis player

== Other fields ==
- Francisco Rodríguez Adrados (1922–2020), Spanish Hellenist
- Francisco Rodríguez Barrientos (born 1956), Costa Rican writer and sociologist
- Francisco Rodríguez (economist), Venezuelan economist
- Francisco Rodríguez Gómez (1911–2009), Mexican politician, governor of Jalisco in 1988–1989
- Francisco Rodríguez Marín (1855–1943), Spanish poet and lexicologist
- Francisco Rodríguez Pascual (1927–2007), Spanish humanist and anthropologist
- Francisco Rodríguez Pérez (1939–2021), Mexican politician from Chihuahua
- Francisco Rodríguez (politician) (born 1938), president of Panama in 1989
- Francisco Rodríguez de Valcárcel (1590–1651), Spanish prelate of the Roman Catholic Church
- Frankie A. Rodriguez (born 1996), American actor

== See also ==
- Frank Rodriguez (disambiguation)
- Francisco Rodrigues (disambiguation)
