= Frank Rodriguez (disambiguation) =

Frank Rodriguez is an American former professional baseball pitcher.

Frank Rodriguez can also refer to:

- Frank J. Rodriguez Sr. (1920–2007), American politician in Minnesota
- Frank Ski (born 1964), Frank Rodriguez, American DJ and radio personality
- Frank Rodriguez, keyboardist for the band ? and the Mysterians

== See also ==
- Francisco Rodríguez
