= Ana Istarú =

Costa Rican poet, actress, and screenwriter

- Born: Ana Soto Marín; February 3, 1960 (age 66); San José, Costa Rica
- Education: University of Costa Rica
- Occupations: Poet; Actress; Playwright; Screenwriter; Columnist
- Notable work: La estación de fiebre Baby boom en el paraíso Hombres en escabeche
- Awards: Guggenheim Fellowship (1990); EDUCA Latin American Poetry Prize (1983); María Teresa León Prize (1995); Hermanos Machado Theatre Prize (1999)

Ana Istarú (born 3 February 1960 in San José, Costa Rica) is a Costa Rican poet, actress, and screenwriter. Best known for her feminist poetry, she has also co-written the screenplay for the movie Caribe (2004).

== Early life and education ==
Born as Ana Soto Marín, Istarú was born on February 3, 1960, in San José to economist and politician Matilde Marín Chinchilla de Soto^{[}^{es]} and Enrique Soto Borbón. She studied theater at the University of Costa Rica.

== Career ==
At the age of fifteen, she published her first book of poems, Palabra nuena. Her second book, Poemas para un día cualquiera (Poems for Any Given Day ), won a prize from Editorial Costa Rica. Her poetry later gained international attention with La estación de fiebre (1983), which received the EDUCA Latin American Poetry Prize. The collection was later republished in Central America and Spain and translated into French in a bilingual edition.

Her poetry, frequently noted for its erotic themes and exploration of gender relations and social conventions, has been translated into several languages, including English, French, German, Dutch, and Italian.

As a playwright, Istarú received the María Teresa León Prize in Spain in 1995 for Baby boom en el paraíso and the Hermanos Machado Theatre Prize in 1999 for Hombres en escabeche. Her plays have been staged in Latin America, North America, Spain, and Portugal, and often examine patriarchal social structures and gender relations through satire and humor.

In addition to her literary work, Istarú has worked as an actress in theater, television, and film. She represented Costa Rica at the Festival d'Avignon and appeared in productions of Latin American and European classical theater. She also starred in the Costa Rican television series Eso que llaman hogar.

She received Costa Rica's National Award for Best Debut Actress in 1980 for her performance as Areúsa in La Celestina. She later received National Awards for Best Leading Actress for Baby boom en el paraíso in 1996 and Virus in 2014.

== Public activities ==
In 2011, Istarú participated as a visiting artist at St. Olaf College in Minnesota, where she gave lectures and readings devoted to literature, theater, and the role of women in Latin American society.

For more than a decade, she has written opinion columns for major Costa Rican newspapers.

In 2015, the National Museum of Costa Rica presented a retrospective program based on excerpts from her theatrical works in connection with International Women's Day.

== Works ==
=== Poetry ===
- Palabra nueva (1975)
- Poemas para un día cualquiera (1977)
- Poemas abiertos y otros amaneceres (1980)
- La estación de fiebre (1983)
- La muerte y otros efímeros agravios (1988)
- Verbo madre (1995)
- Poesía escogida (2002)

=== Plays ===
- El vuelo de la grulla
- Madre nuestra que estás en la tierra
- Baby boom en el paraíso
- Hombres en escabeche
- La loca (2005)
