= Francisco Rodrigues =

Francisco Rodrigues may refer to:

- Francisco Rodrigues (Brazilian footballer) (1925–1988)
- Francisco Rodrigues (Portuguese footballer) (1914–?)
- Francisco Rodrigues Lobo (1580–1622), Portuguese poet

== See also ==
- Francisco Rodríguez (disambiguation)
- Francisco Martins Rodrigues (1927–2008)
