= Carlos Echandi =

Costa Rican surgeon and murder victim

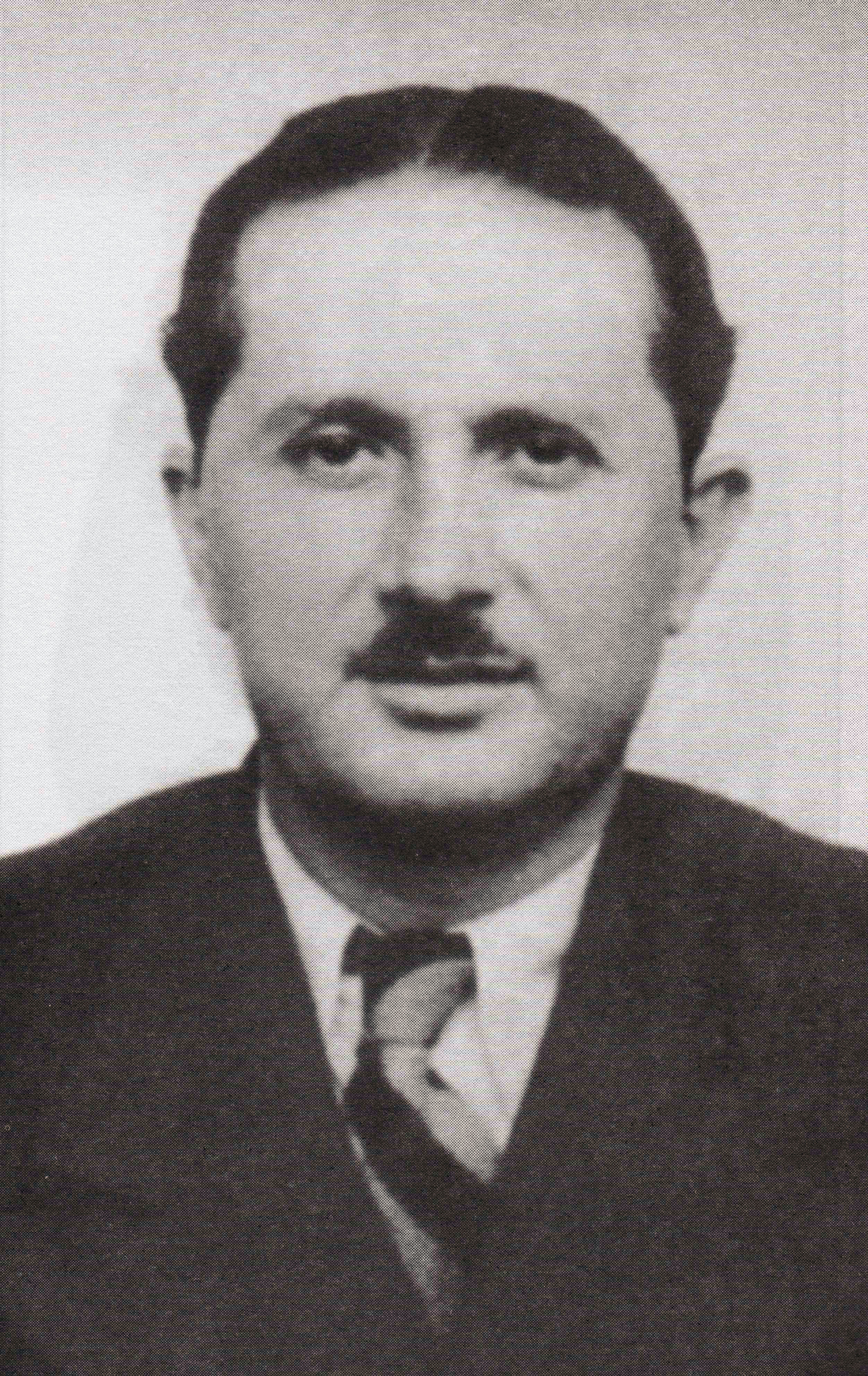
- Born: October 20, 1900; San José, Costa Rica
- Died: August 23, 1938 (aged 37); San José, Costa Rica
- Education: Yale University (M.D.)
- Occupations: Physician, surgeon, politician
- Spouse: Julieta Brenes Hine
- Children: 4

Carlos Manuel Echandi Lahmann (October 20, 1900 – August 23, 1938) was a Costa Rican surgeon murdered by Beltrán Cortés. Prior to killing Echandi, Cortés killed Dr Ricardo Moreno Cañas and killed one more person and injured two more while escaping from Echandi's house. The crimes were heavily covered by the Costa Rican media at the time.

== Family and education ==
He was born on October 20, 1900, to José Antonio Echandi González and Margarita Lahmann Carazo. He married Julieta Brenes Hine. They had four children: Hilda, Olga (who died at a young age), Carlos Manuel and María Elena.

In 1925, he graduated from Yale University in New Haven, Connecticut, as a M.D. In 1925, he joined the University of Costa Rica's Faculty of Medicine.

== Career ==
in 1926, he joined Hospital San Juan de Dios as an intern. In late 1927, he was appointed a medical assistant to Dr. Moreno in surgery and orthopedics. On August 25, 1936, he was put on charge of the Doctor Carlos Durán General Service Clinic. As Dr. Moreno's assistant he took part of the surgeries performed on Beltrán Cortés to repair an anterior lesion in his right arm.

The procedures did not have the expected results. Cortés would always resent him and Dr. Moreno for having used him, according to him, as a test subject in an experimental procedure. He later claimed that he had gone to the hospital to get treated for a pain in his leg and that Dr. Moreno took advantage of this to take a graft of bone from his healthy arm for a foreign patient.

He served as a deputy in the Legislative Assembly from 1932 to 1936.

== Death ==
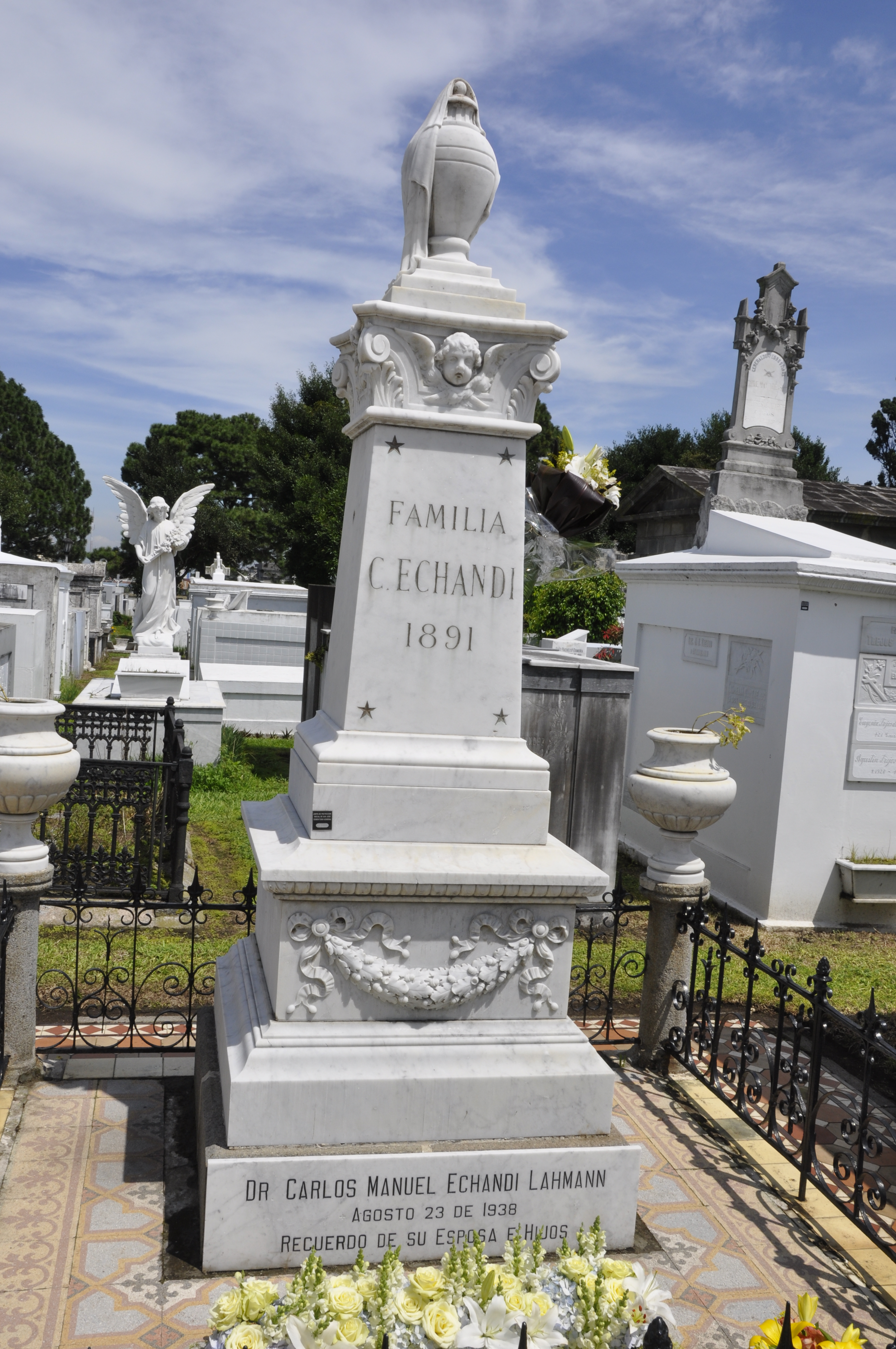
The grave of Carlos Echandi

On the evening of August 23, 1938, Beltrán Cortés went to Dr. Moreno's house and shot him three times. He later headed to Dr. Echandi's house, knocked on the door and was received by the footman. Dr. Echandi was on his way out, as he had heard on the radio the news of Dr. Moreno's death and wanted to go to the crime scene. Cortés shot him twice from the front gate. One bounced off the door, so only one of the shots actually hit him. The bullet perforated his pulmonary artery, killing him.

Both doctors' funerals were held the next day in the Metropolitan Cathedral. The ceremony was assisted by several government officials, members of the Costa Rican high society, and many common citizens.
