= Virginia Grutter =

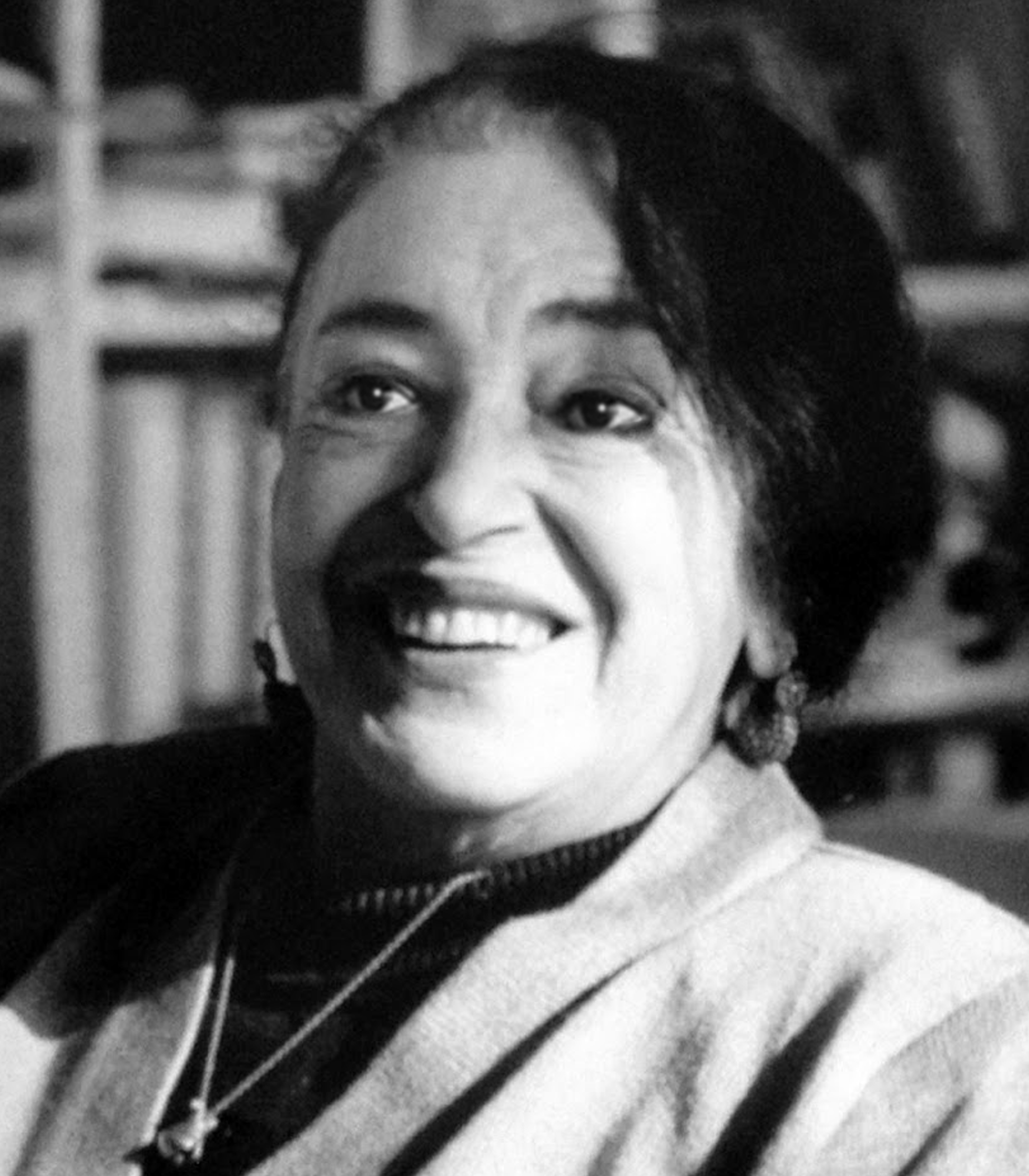
Image of Virginia Grütter Jiménez

Virginia Grütter (born Virginia Teresa del Carmen and Inés, Puntarenas, Costa Rica, 20 April 1929 – 3 March 2000) was a Costa Rican writer, actress and theatrical director. In the year 2000 she died of respiratory failure.

== Publications ==
Poetry

- "Give me your hand" (1954).
- "Poetry of this world" (1973).
- "Cradle songs and of battle" (1994). Áncora Prize of Literature in 1996.

Prose

- "Friends and the wind" (the original title was "Boris") (1978).
- "Missing" (1980).
- "Singing to my time: memories" (1998).
