= Carlos Salazar Herrera =

Costa Rican writer, journalist, and artist

Carlos Salazar Herrera (1906–1980) is a Costa Rican writer, journalist, engraver and sculptor. He was born in San José, Costa Rica, where he attended primary and secondary school. He wrote his first short story at the age of 9, named "The Three Captains of a Ship". At the age of 14, he received his first award for an essay entitled "El café". In 1928 he participated in a contest in which he presented his work about renewing Costa Rican art, and in the same year, he received the second place award for his story "La Piedra de Toxil" in a literary contest organized by Editorial de Costa Rica.. In 1930 he started working at the Repertorio Americano where he published around 20 short stories. In 1934 he began doing wood etchings on caboa and other kinds of wood. In 1935 he got another reward due to the sculpture he made (el motivo or the motive).
