= Jorge Debravo =

Costa Rican poet

- Born: January 31, 1938; Turrialba, Costa Rica
- Died: August 4, 1967 (aged 29); San José, Costa Rica
- Occupation: poet
- Spouse: Margarita Salazar
- Children: 2

Jorge Debravo (January 31, 1938 - August 4, 1967) was a prominent poet from Costa Rica.

Debravo was born in Guayabo, on the slopes of the Turrialba Volcano in Costa Rica. He was the oldest of five children where he spent his early years helping his father, Joaquín Bravo Ramírez, manage a small milpa. Debravo was taught to read and write by his mother, Cristina Brenes and by the age of fourteen he was able to enter the fifth grade thanks to a scholarship. The first book he purchased was a dictionary.

A popular anecdote says that Debravo wrote his first poems on banana paper. Eventually, his first works would get published in a local magazine called "El Turrialbeño" by the time he was in the ninth grade. He would soon leave school to start working for the Caja Costarricense del Seguro Social (Social Security).

In 1959 he married Margarita Salazar, with whom he had two children: Lucrecia, in 1960, and Raimundo in 1961.

Jorge Debravo was killed in 1967, at age 29, when he was the victim of a drunk driving incident, being hit by a drunk driver while driving his motorcycle to his job in San Pedro, San José

January 31, the day he was born, is celebrated in Costa Rica as the National Day of Poetry.
