= David Cruz (poet) =

Costa Rican writer and journalist

- Born: San José, San José, Costa Rica
- Education: University of Texas at El Paso, University of Washington
- Occupations: Writer, scholar and journalist

David Cruz (San José, 1982) is a Costa Rican writer, scholar and journalist.

== Biography ==
He was born in San José, but grew up in Arancibia and Montes de Oro, Puntarenas. He obtained a degree in journalism in Costa Rica, a master's degree in Creative Writing from the University of Texas at El Paso and his PhD in Hispanic Studies at the University of Washington in Seattle, where he has also taught several courses.

He has published five poetry books and received multiple awards such as the International Manuel Acuña Poetry Prize in 2020. That same year he was a finalist at the Montreal International Poetry Prize. He has been named as an outstanding poet in the new Latin American poerty.

== Prizes and awards ==
He has received multiple awards, including:

- "Immigrants", a poem published by the Academy of American Poets' Poem-a-day on their website poets.org
- Gold Medal at the Latino Books Awards 2023 Best Poetry Anthology for Cine fractal
- International Manuel Acuña Poetry Prize 2020 for Lazarus, awarded by the State of Cohauila, Mexico.
- Finalist at the Montreal Internacional Poetry Prize 2020 for the poem Cesár Vallejo Will Never See Winter Again (Paris in Two Voices), awarded by McGill University, Montreal, Canada.
- VII Premio Mesoamericano de Poesía Luis Cardoza y Aragón 2011 for Lazarus, awarded by the Mexican Embassy in Guatemala.
- Premio Joven Creación 2005 for Natación nocturna, Editorial Costa Rica.

== Works ==
His poetry has been acclaimed as part of a group of fresh Costa Rican poets, highlighting technological elements, posthumanism and pop culture in his poetry works. His style includes a deep abstract realisms language between the experimental and traditional.

His works have been partially translated to English, Japanase, Italian, Portuguese and French. He has also been featured in more than ten poetry anthologies.

== Books ==
- Cine Fractal Antología personal 2005 2023 (New Aleph, Estados Unidos, 2024)
- Lazarus (Mantis editores) Guadalajara México 2023)
- A ella le gusta llorar mientras escucha The Beatles (Valparaiso Ediciones, Granada, 2013; 2ª ed. ampliada 2017)
- She likes to cry while listening to The Beatles (Valparaíso Ediciones USA, Tennessee, 2017)
- Trasatlántico (Editorial Cultura, Guatemala, 2011, 2ª ed. Editorial Costa Rica, San José 2015)
- Natación nocturna (Editorial Costa Rica, San José, 2005)

== Anthologies ==
- El canon abierto. Última poesía en español (1970–1985). Visor libros Madrid
- Región. Antología del cuento político latinoamericano". Ediciones Interzona Buenos Aires, 2011.
- Poesía del Encuentro. Antología del VII Encuentro Internacional de Escritores. Media Isla Editores, Miami, 2010. ISBN 978-0-557-57083-6
- Sostener la palabra Antología de poesía costarricense contemporánea. Ediciones arboleda, 2007.
- Lunadas poéticas. Editorial Andrómeda, San José (Costa Rica), 2006.
