= Julián Marchena =

Costa Rican poet

- Born: March 14, 1897; San José
- Died: May 5, 1985 (aged 88); San José
- Burial place: Catedral, San José, San José, Costa Rica
- Occupation: Poet
- Spouse: Victoria Meza Murillo (m. 1930, divorced) María Segreda Víquez (before 1985)
- Parent: Eduardo Marchena Avellán (father) Ángela Guadalupe Valle-Riestra Cañas (mother)

Julián Marchena Valleriestra (March 14, 1897 – May 5, 1985) was a Costa Rican poet. He was a recipient of the Magón National Prize for Culture in 1963.

Much of his poetry, such as Vuelo supremo, Viajar, viajar, and Lo efímero y Romance de las carretas, form part of the collective memory of Costa Rica. Along with the Concherías of Aquileo J. Echeverría, Alas en fuga, his only book, forms part of the repertory of classical texts that are widely known in the country.

== Biography ==
Julián Marchena was born in San José on March 14, 1897. He later graduated as an accountant from the Liceo de Costa Rica. Afterwards, he studied law for five years, but never graduated as a lawyer.

His first marriage was with Victoria Meza Murillo, they married on July 23, 1930, and they were in Cartago, Costa Rica. His second marriage was to María Segreda Víquez. From 1938 to 1967 and from 1974 to 1979 he served as Director of the Biblioteca Nacional (National Library) and was a member of la Academia Costarricense de la Lengua (Costa Rican Academy of Language).

He published single poems at first; it was not until 1941 that these were compiled into a single book, called Alas en Fuga (Wings in Flight). The book was re-edited in 1965, and some new poems were added. In 1963, he received the Premio Magón, the greatest prize bestowed by the Governor of Costa Rica in recognition of the cultural labor of one person.

Julián Marchena died in San José, May 5, 1985, at the age of 88 and was buried in Catedral, San José, San José, Costa Rica.

== Literary works ==
- Alas en Fuga (1941)

This work has a clear modernist tendency. His poems, even though they are very elaborately constructed, are easy to interpret. Generally, his poems are full of resonance, harmony, concrete images and numerous metaphors. However, he dispenses with high-sounding rhetoric, the exotic and the mythological. In form, Marchena respects the classical formulas of poetry and, as far as content, treats themes such as love, pain, and liberty.

=== Other publications ===
- Amor. 59 pp. 1982
- La biblioteca como medio de cultura: a work read aloud in the National Theatre (Teatro Nacional), on the occasion of the First National Day of the Book, 24 to 31 August 1954. Editorial Atenea, 15 pp.
