= Carlos Gagini =

Costa Rican writer

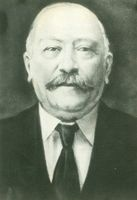
- Born: 15 March 1865; San José, Costa Rica
- Died: 31 March 1925 (aged 60); San José, Costa Rica

Carlos Gagini (1865 – 1925) was a Costa Rican intellectual, philologist writer, esperantist and linguist.

He was born in Costa Rica, in a family of Swiss descent. He was a significant figure in linguistics and literature in Costa Rica. His work in language studies formed the basis for a large part of Costa Rican academic exploration during the twentieth century.

== Life and career ==
He published many works about education, grammar, and anthropology.

In literature, he supported the national character of Costa Rican writing, in contrast to other authors who looked to European models for inspiration. As a strong defender of national identity and independence, he wrote a novel which criticized imperialism.

In 2001, on the 75th anniversary of his death, in the faculty of Arts and Letters of the University of Costa Rica, an esperanto memorial was inaugurated in his memory.

== Works by Gagini ==
- Diccionario de Barbarimos y Provincialismos de Costa Rica (1892)
- Ensayo Lexicográfico sobre la Lengua Térraba (1892)
- Chamarasca (1898)
- Diccionario de Costarriqueñismos (1919)
- La Caida del Aguila (1920)
- Erizo: novela histórica
- El árbol enfermo
- Redemptions: a Costa Rican novel translated by E. Bradford Burns (1985)

== Biography ==
- Carlos Gagini. Presentado por Lilia Ramos y Mariana de Silva (1972)
- Al través de mi vida (1961)
