= José Marín Cañas =

Costa Rican writer (1904–1980)

José Marín Cañas (1904–1980) was a Costa Rican novelist, playwright, travel writer and journalist, particularly known for his novels El infierno verde (1935) and Pedro Arnáez (1942).

He was born in San José, Costa Rica in 1904. His parents were Spanish, and he was educated in both Costa Rica and Spain. He worked in various occupations, most importantly journalism, which included his doing radio broadcasts of football matches. His literary career began in 1928, at which point he won prizes for both a short story and a chronicle. His literary output includes the novels El infierno verde, about the Chaco War between Bolivia and Paraguay, and Pedro Arnáez, which concerns El Salvador's Matanza, among other topics. He also served as director of the newspaper La Hora. He died in 1980.

== Bibliography ==
- Lágrimas de acera (Tears of Steel; novel, 1929)
- Los bigardos del ron (The Drunken Beggars; short-story collection, 1929)
- Como tú (Like You; play, 1929)
- Tú, la imposible (novel, 1931)
- Coto (historical chronicle, 1934)
- El infierno verde (The Green Inferno; novel, 1935)
- En busca de un candidato (In Search of a Candidate; play, 1935)
- "Pueblo macho" (essay, 1937)
- Una tragedia de ocho cilindros (A Tragedy in Eight Cylinders; play, 1938)
- Pedro Arnáez (novel, 1942)
- "Tierra de conejos" (travel narrative, 1971)
- "Ensayos" (essay, 1972)
- "Valses nobles y sentimentales" (short story, 1981)
