= Ricardo Moreno Cañas =

Costa Rican politician

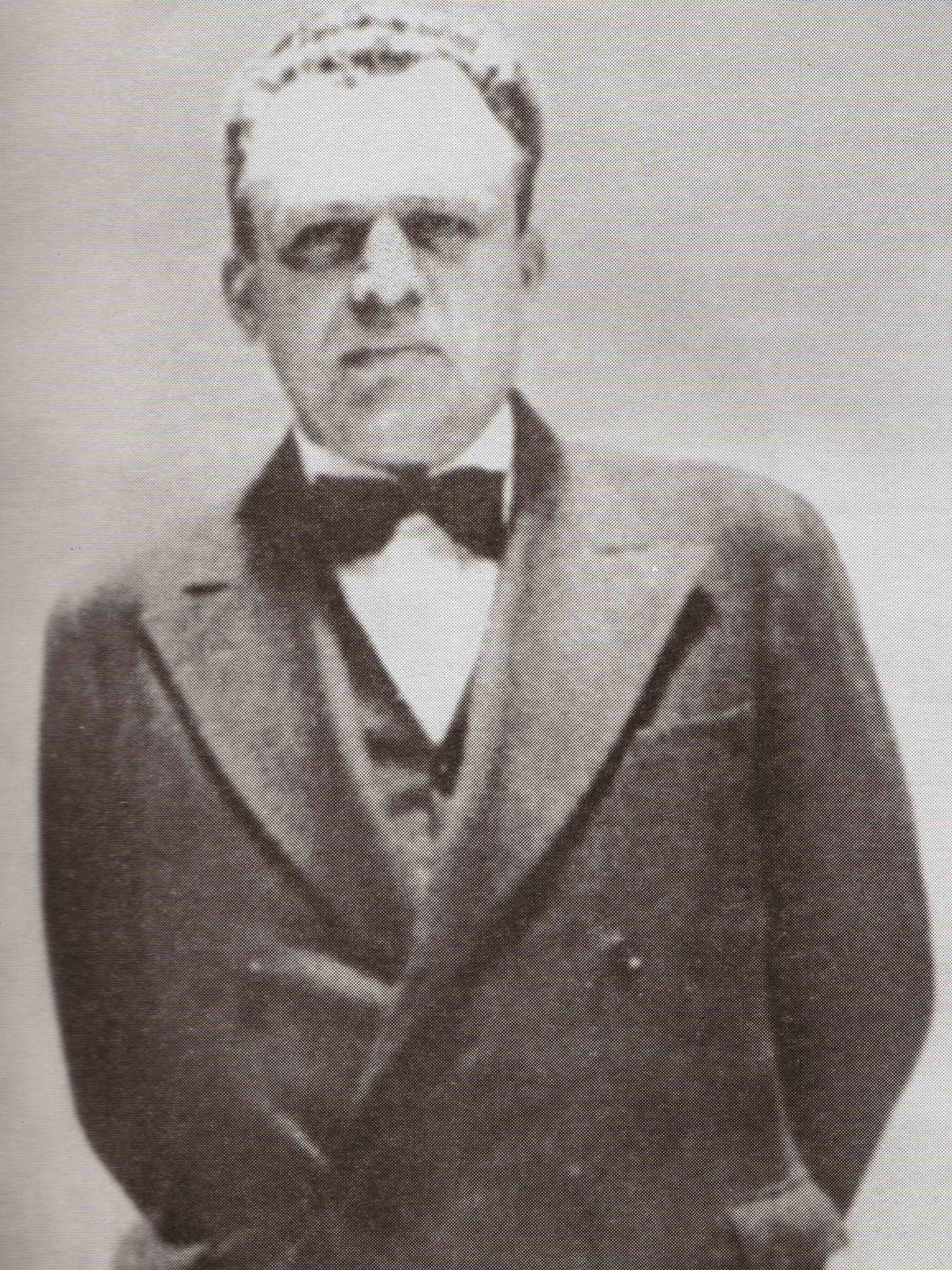

Ricardo Moreno Cañas (May 8, 1890 – August 23, 1938) was a Costa Rican physician and congressman.

He was shot dead by Beltrán Cortés, reportedly due to an unsuccessful surgery Moreno performed on him.

He is a historical personality revered and prayed to religiously by the local population.
