= Uriel Quesada =

Costa Rican writer, professor, and LGBT activist

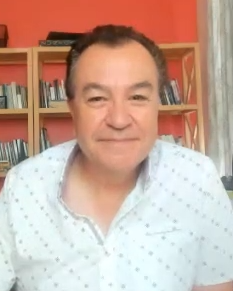
Uriel Quesada in 2022

Uriel Quesada Román (b. July 6, 1962) is a Costa Rican writer, professor, and LGBT rights activist. He is considered one of the most prominent figures in contemporary Costa Rican literature. He currently resides in the United States and works as a professor at Loyola University New Orleans.

== Biography ==
He began his literary career in the 1980s with the short story collection Ese día de los temblores (1985). This was followed by El atardecer de los niños (1990), which won him the Premio Nacional Aquileo J Echeverría in the short story category, and Larga vida al deseo (1995).

In 1999, he published the short story “Bienvenido a tu nueva vida” in the cultural magazine Áncora, part of La Nación, which sparked strong controversy due to its homosexual theme. The story narrates in plain language the tale of a young man on a train who meets a newlywed English couple. During the journey, the English man discreetly caresses the protagonist’s leg and later performs oral sex on him in the restroom. The story was later included in the book Lejos, tan lejos (2004), which won the Ancora Prize in 2005.

In 2005, he published the novel El gato de sí mismo, considered one of his most notable works. The novel, which earned him the Aquileo J. Echeverría National Prize for best novel, follows, in autobiographical tone, the life of Germán Germanóvich, a boy whose thoughts mix reality with fantasy. He flees his home in Santa Cruz to escape his father’s rejection and falls in love with another boy named Íñigo.

His next work was the novel Mar Caníbal (2016), which tells the story of two sisters who go on a journey with others after learning their father has joined a new woman and is raising a new daughter, who they fear may claim part of the inheritance. One of the characters, Gonzalo, begins to discover his homosexuality in 1970s Central America.

In 2018, he published the short story collection La invención y el olvido, for which he again won the Aquileo J. Echeverría National Prize in the short story category.

== Works ==
=== Short story collections ===
- Ese día de los temblores (1985)
- El atardecer de los niños (1990)
- Larga vida al deseo (1995)
- Lejos, tan lejos (2004)
- Viajero que huye (2008)
- La invención y el olvido (2018)

=== Novels ===
- Si trina la Canaria (1999)
- El gato de sí mismo (2005)
- Mar Caníbal (2016)

== See also ==
- LGBTQ people
