= Carlos Cortés Zúñiga =

Carlos Eduardo Cortés Zúñiga (Note: In this Hispanic American name, the first or paternal surname is Cortés and the second or maternal family name is Zúñiga.) (born 1962) is a Costa Rican novelist, poet, and essayist. He also served as editor-in-chief of the Costa Rican newspaper La Nación.

== Biography ==
Cortés Zúñiga was born in San José, Costa Rica, in 1962. He studied journalism and communication in Costa Rica, Spain, and France. In 1996, he graduated from the French Press Institute (Paris), and in 1997, he obtained a postgraduate degree in the sociology of media and culture from the University of Paris II.

He is the author of award-winning books of poetry, short stories, anthologies of Central American literature, and novels.

He also writes articles and columns for magazines and newspapers in Latin America and Spain: El País, La Jornada Semanal, the Casa de las Américas magazine, Leopard.

In 2001, the Maison des écrivains étrangers et des traducteurs (MEET) in Saint-Nazaire awarded him a grant, and in 2003 he published the novel/short story *Tanda de cuatro con Laura* followed by *La invención de Costa Rica*. In 2004, he received the Luis Cardoza y Aragón Mesoamerican Prize for *Autorretratos y cruci/ficciones/fictions*. *. In 2007, he published the novel/essay/fiction *La gran novela perdida. Historia personal de la narrativa costarrisible*, which won the national essay prize.
