= Joaquín García Monge =

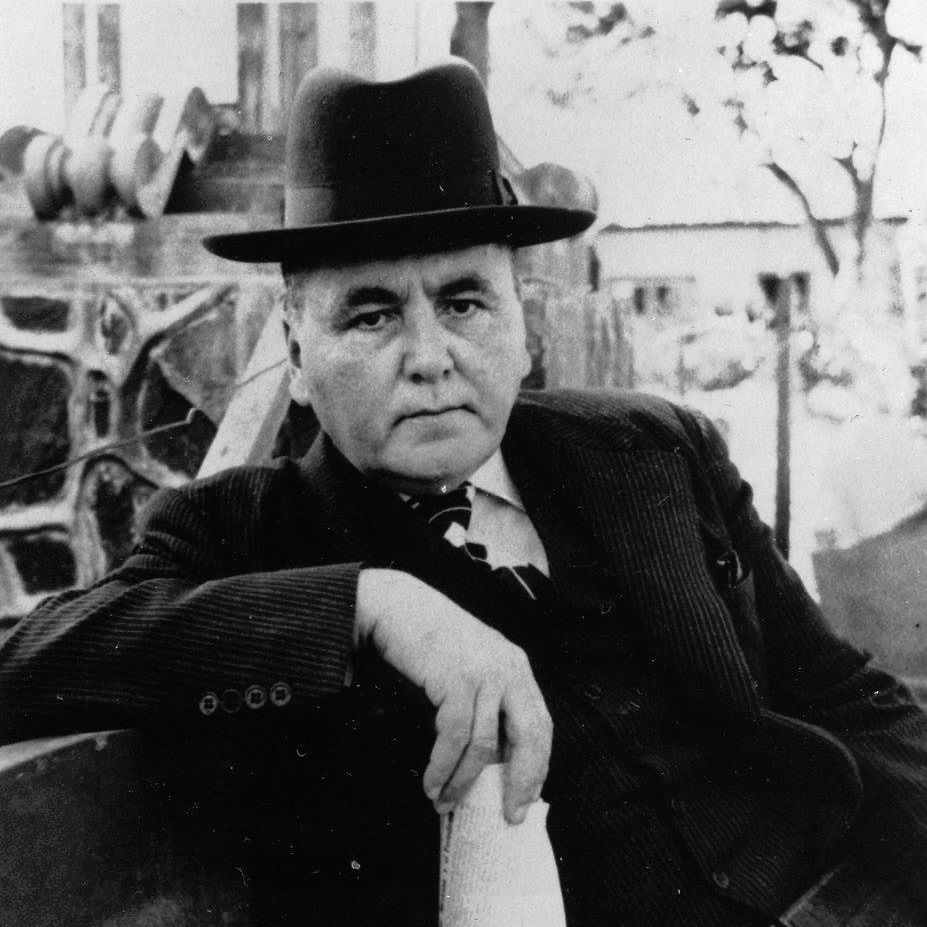
- Joaquín García Monge in 1919
- Born: Joaquín García Monge; January 20, 1881; Desamparados, Costa Rica
- Died: October 31, 1958 (aged 77); San José, Costa Rica
- Children: Eugenio García Carrillo
- Writing career
- Language: Spanish
- Period: 20th century
- Genres: Novel, Short story, Essay
- Notable works: El Moto, Las hijas del campo, Abnegación, La mala sombra y otros sucesos
- Movement: Repertorio Americano

Joaquín García Monge (January 20, 1881 – January 1, 1958) is considered one of Costa Rica's most important writers.

He was born in Desamparados, Costa Rica in 1881 and was educated in both Costa Rica and Chile, where he fell under the influence of the leading literary currents of his time. He was the director of Costa Rica's Biblioteca Nacional from 1920 to 1936 and had considerable influence over the education system of the country during his lifetime. Joaquín was acknowledged as a leading contributor to the literary genre known as the cuadro de costumbre, following the innovations made by Manuel González Zeledón ("Magón"). He is most famous for his short novel El moto (1900). Joaquín died in 1958.

== Bibliography ==
- El moto (novel, 1900)
- Hijas del campo (novel, 1900)
- Abnegación (novel, 1902)
- Ariel (story collection, 1905–1916)
- “La mala sombra y otros sucesos” (short story, 1917)
