= Daniel Gallegos =

American attorney, former state court judge, military officer

Daniel J. Gallegos

Judge of the New Mexico Court of Appeals
- In office January 2018 – December 2018

District Judge, Second Judicial District Court
- In office January 2019 - December 2020

Personal details
- Born: March 19, 1978 (age 48)
- Party: Republican
- Education: University of Notre Dame (BBA) University of New Mexico (MS) Notre Dame Law School (JD) Georgetown University Law Center (LLM)

Military service
- Branch/service: U.S. Navy
- Rank: Commander

Daniel J. Gallegos (born March 19, 1978) is an American attorney, a former judge on the New Mexico Court of Appeals in Santa Fe, New Mexico, and a former district judge on the Second Judicial District Court in Bernalillo County, New Mexico. He is a member of the Republican Party.

== Early life and education ==
Gallegos was born and raised in Albuquerque, New Mexico, where he graduated from St. Pius X High School (Albuquerque) in 1996. Gallegos attended the University of Notre Dame and earned a Bachelor of Business Administration degree in 2000. He then attended the University of New Mexico and earned a Master of Science in Physical Education degree in 2001. He then attended Notre Dame Law School, where he earned a Juris Doctor degree cum laude in 2005. In his third year of law school, Gallegos won the featherweight championship of Notre Dame's famous Bengal Bouts and was awarded the "Dan Adam Award" as the law school's best boxer. In 2025, Gallegos graduated with distinction from Georgetown University Law Center with an L.L.M. in National Security Law.

== Career ==
=== Military service ===
After law school, Gallegos joined the United States Navy Judge Advocate General's Corps. After graduating from the Naval Justice School with honors in 2005, he reported to Naval Air Station Jacksonville as a military prosecutor. In 2007, Gallegos deployed to Iraq in support of Operation Iraqi Freedom, where he served as a legal advisor with Multi-National Force – Iraq, Task Force 134. In 2008, Gallegos reported as deputy command judge advocate on board USS Nimitz (CVN-68).

In 2010, Gallegos left active duty and joined the United States Navy Reserve. As a reserve Navy JAG, he variously served as an operational law attorney with the United States Third Fleet, United States Pacific Fleet, and the United States Sixth Fleet reserve legal offices. He also served as staff judge advocate for SEAL Team 17 and for the Navy reserve component of United States Special Operations Command. From 2014-2015, Gallegos mobilized to Joint Task Force Guantanamo, where he served as liaison to the International Committee of the Red Cross.

From 2023-2025, Gallegos was mobilized to the Pentagon to serve as Senior Legal and Policy Advisor within the Office of the Assistant Secretary of Defense for Special Operations and Low-Intensity Conflict (SO/LIC), which falls under the Office of the Under Secretary of Defense for Policy.

In January 2026, Gallegos was mobilized and detailed to the United States Department of Justice Executive Office of Immigration Review to serve as a Temporary Immigration Judge.

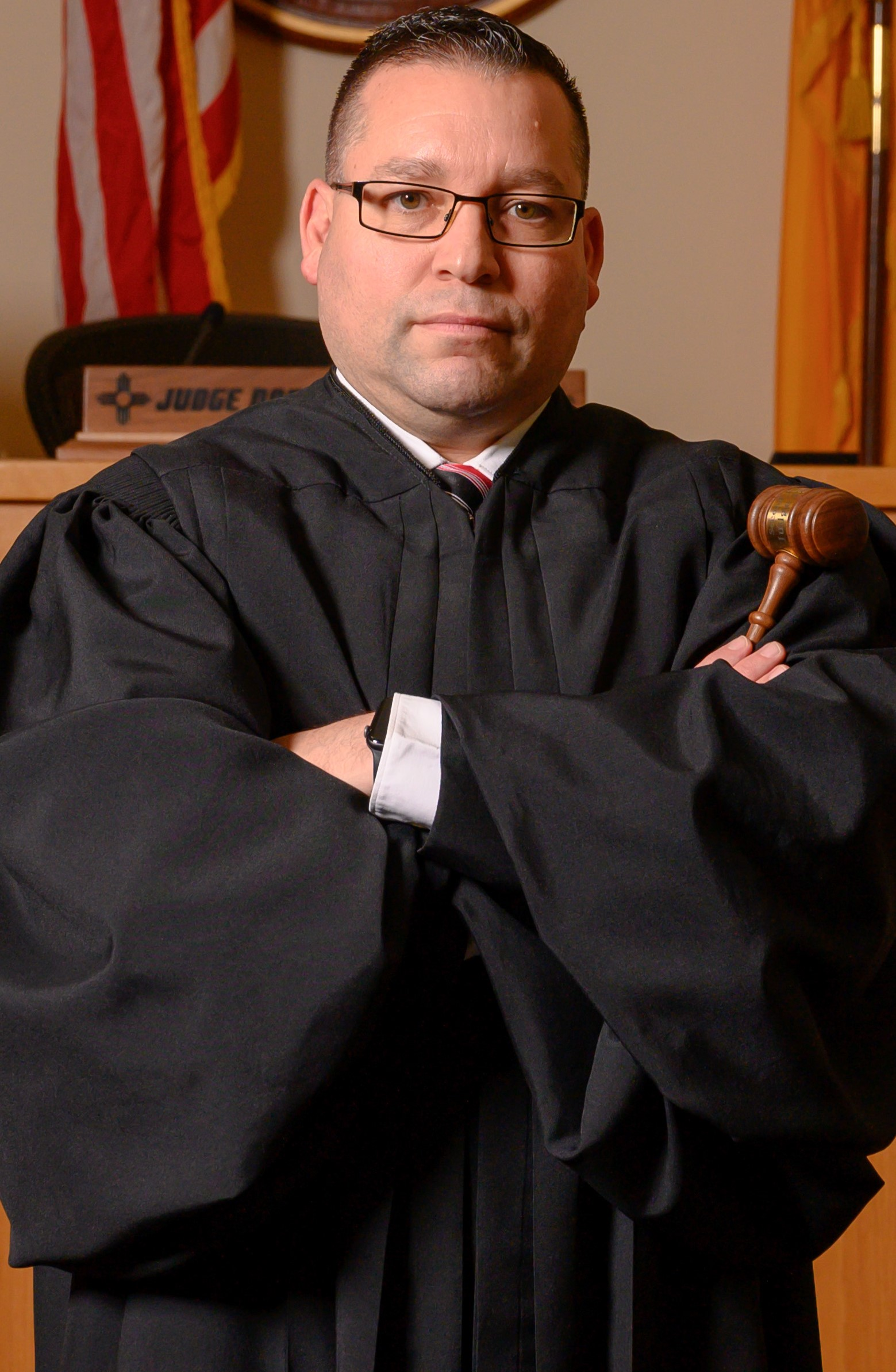
Judge Daniel Gallegos in 2019

=== Civilian legal career ===
In 2010, Gallegos became a prosecutor with the 13th Judicial District Attorney's Office in Sandoval County, New Mexico. In 2011, he became a prosecutor with the 2nd Judicial District Attorney's Office in Bernalillo County, New Mexico. In 2013, he became a staff attorney at the New Mexico Court of Appeals in Albuquerque, New Mexico. From 2015-2018, Gallegos served on the board of directors of the National Hispanic Cultural Center. In 2021, Gallegos joined Harrison & Hart, LLC, as an attorney.

=== Judicial service ===
In January 2018, Gallegos was appointed to the New Mexico Court of Appeals by Governor Susana Martinez. He ran a statewide campaign to keep his seat on the court. He was the subject of an attack ad paid for by New Mexico trial lawyers, portraying him as a puppet of Governor Martinez. In response, Gallegos is quoted by The Santa Fe New Mexican as saying, “It is a disappointing turn of events, given that judicial elections in New Mexico, while nominally partisan, are supposed to be different“ and that "[t]his overt and rancorous appeal to partisanship is antithetical to the concept of judicial independence and the rule of law.” Gallegos went on to lose to Democrat Megan Duffy, 54.5% to 45.5%, the closest statewide race in the 2018 New Mexico elections.

In December 2018, Governor Martinez appointed Gallegos to the Second Judicial District Court in Bernalillo County, New Mexico, where he presided over felony criminal cases. In November 2020, he lost a partisan countywide election to Democrat Courtney Weaks, 56.2% to 43.8%. His 43.8% was the best performance of any Republican in Bernalillo County in the 2020 New Mexico elections.

In January 2026, Gallegos was mobilized by the U.S. Navy and detailed to the United States Department of Justice Executive Office of Immigration Review to serve as a Temporary Immigration Judge.

== Family ==
His father, Danny Gallegos, is a retired firefighter with Albuquerque Fire Rescue and his mother, Connie Gallegos, retired from the Albuquerque Public Schools. His brother, Dominic Gallegos, is a Captain with Albuquerque Fire Rescue.
