= Repertorio Americano =

20th-century Costa Rican magazine

- Issue 1 cover dated 1 September 1919
- Editor: Joaquín García Monge
- Categories: Culture, Philosophy, Science, Education
- Frequency: Fortnightly
- First issue: 1 September 1919
- Country: Costa Rica
- Language: Spanish

Repertorio Americano was a cultural magazine published in San José, Costa Rica, for nearly 40 years between 1919 and 1958. The editor was Joaquín García Monge, a teacher, writer, intellectual and journalist. It was billed as "Cuadernos de Cultura Hispánica" (notebooks of Hispanic culture) and featured works by young Latin American writers across multiple disciplines including philosophy, the arts, science, and education. Initially published fortnightly, the magazine became a significant forum for discussion for Latin American intellectuals of the period, and is unique in the region for its longevity.

García Monge viewed journalists as fundamental to promoting democratic ideals, and imbued Repertorio Americano with the values of republicanism, anti-fascism, and pacifism.

== Background ==
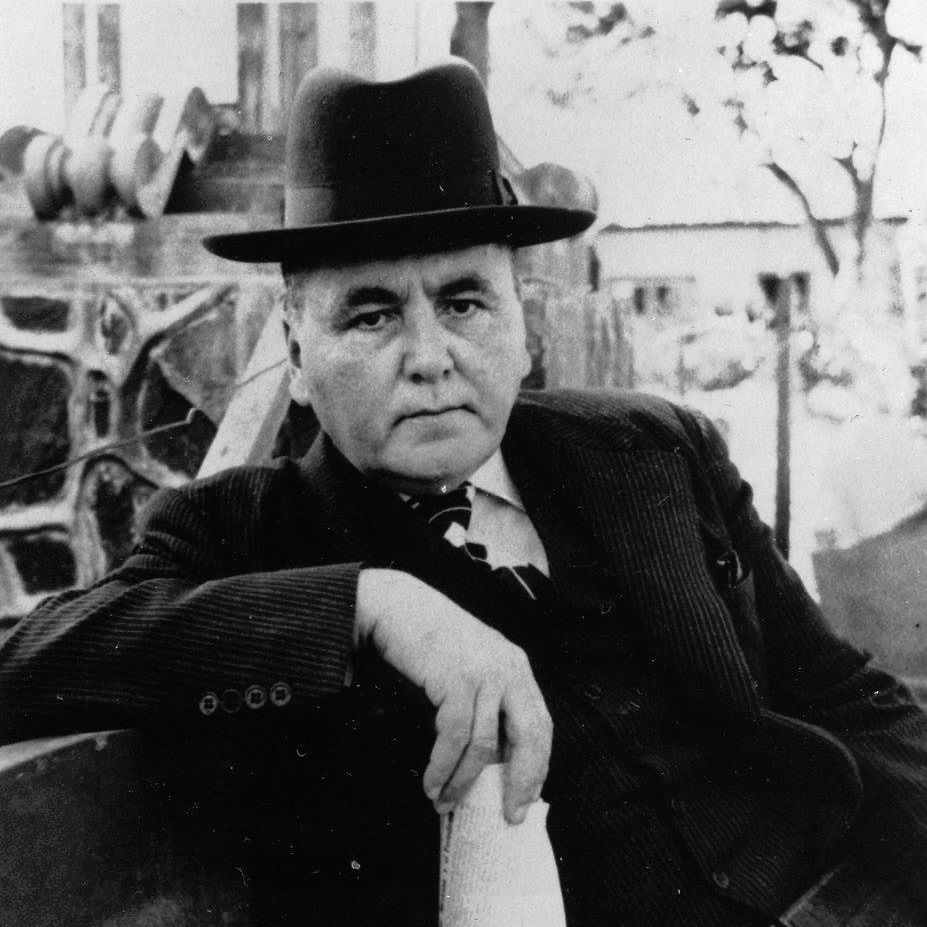
Joaquín García Monge

García Monge named and modeled his Repertorio Americano on the magazine published by Andrés Bello in London nearly a century earlier, from 1826 to 1827. Like Bello, he envisioned a magazine that would support the advancement of culture, education, and philosophy in Latin America. Since 1906, García Monge had also been an editor for magazines such as Ariel and El Convivio.

== Contents ==
The first issue of Repertorio Americano edited by García Monge was published on 1 September 1919. In its early issues, the magazine presented itself as "about Spanish and foreign" news, "philosophy and literature, arts, sciences and education, miscellanea and documents".

Over the course of its publication, the magazine included articles, illustrations and drawings by young writers and artists from all over Latin America. Although some works were republished from elsewhere, with the author's permission, many of the articles and texts printed were specifically and exclusively written for Repertorio Americano.

While García Monge published very little of his own work within Repertorio Americano, he did write and publish a series of essays criticizing the dictatorships of the period. Dictatorships that were denounced in the pages of Repertorio Americano included Rafael Trujillo of the Dominican Republic; Anastasio Somoza García of Nicaragua; Fulgencio Batista of Cuba; and many others.

There were a total of 50 volumes in the series, the last one published in May 1958 after García Monge's death by his son, Eugenio García Carrillo.

== Impact ==
Modern historians have praised Repertorio Americano as a valuable resource.

García Monge likened the magazine to a banquet where the thinkers of the time would come together, discover each other and exchange ideas. With nationalist attitudes still lingering from the XIX century, Repertorio Americano provided a space where calls were made for the political and social transformation of Latin American countries, with the emphasis of creating a Hispanic-american alliance.

The magazine's criticism of authoritarian governments resulted in reprisals against García Monge, as well as censorship, making circulation challenging in certain countries.

== Revival ==
Starting in 1974, Repertorio Americano was published once again by the Institute of Latin American Studies (Instituto de Estudios Latinoamericanos) of the National University of Costa Rica (Universidad Nacional de Costa Rica). The new issues continue the numbering sequence of the original series, but are published bi-annually. The editorial style differs from the original model created by García Monge in 1919 but maintains some loyalty to it.

== Notable writers ==
Acclaimed writers featured in the magazine included, among many others:

- Gabriela Mistral
- Pablo Neruda
- Victoria Ocampo
- Teresa de la Parra
- Alfonso Reyes
- José Vasconcelos

== Artists ==
Artists whose works were published included:

- Emilia Prieto Trugores
- Francisco Amighetti
- Carlos Salazar Herrera
- Juan Manuel Sánchez
- Manuel de la Cruz González
- Francisco Zúñiga
