= Eunice Odio =

Costa Rican writer

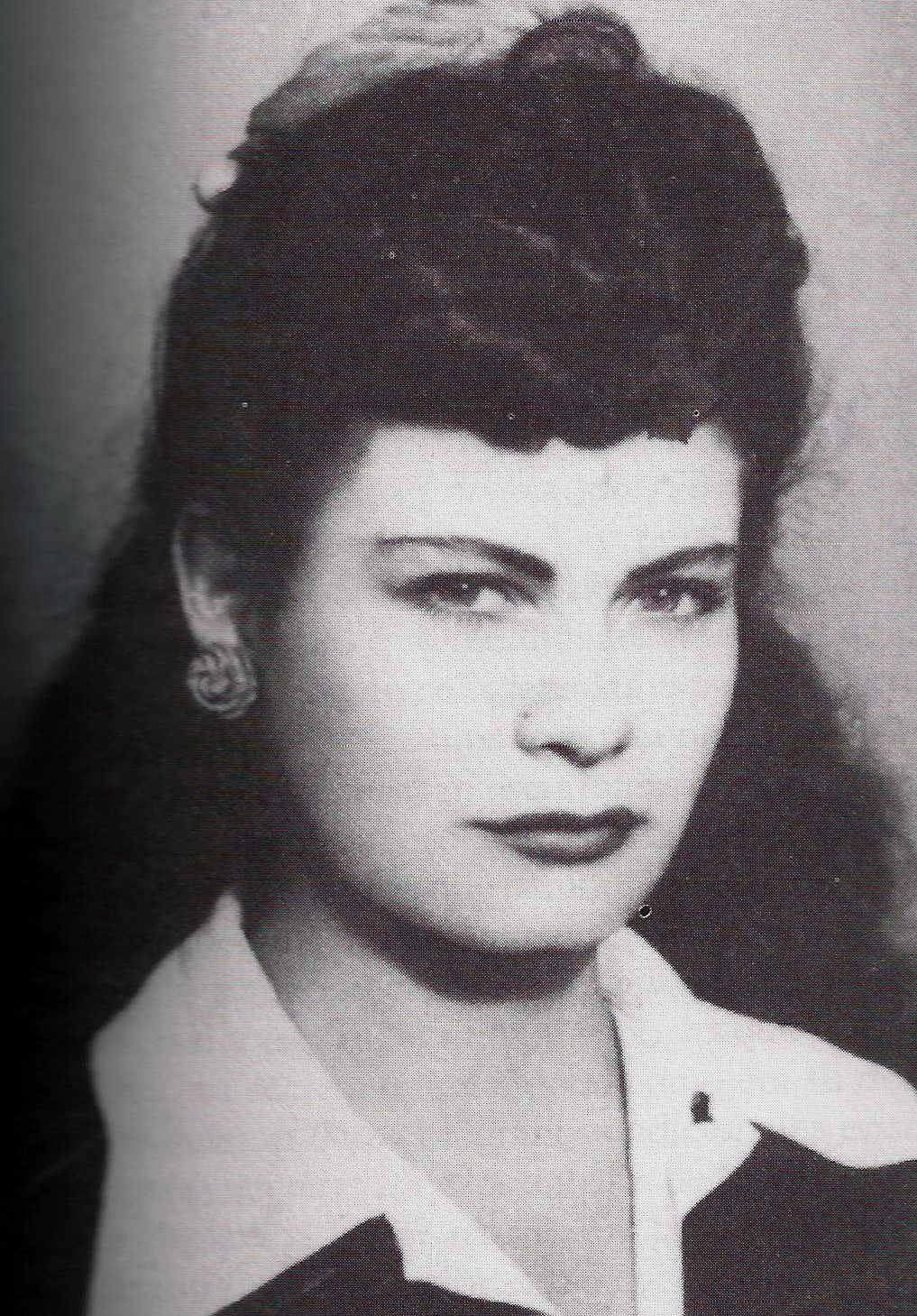
- Born: October 18, 1919; San José, Costa Rica
- Died: March 23, 1974 (aged 54); Mexico City, Mexico
- Occupations: Poet, Journalist, Educator
- Spouse: Rodolfo Zanabria
- Writing career
- Pen name: Catalina Mariel
- Period: 20th Century
- Notable works: Los elementos terrestres, El tránsito de fuego

Eunice Odio (pseudonym, Catalina Mariel; October 18, 1919 – March 23, 1974) was a prominent Costa Rican poet known for her diverse body of work, including articles, essays, reflections, letters, short stories, and children's literature. She also held roles as a journalist and educator, teaching English and French.

She was born in San José, Costa Rica. Odio resided in various countries including Costa Rica, Mexico, Cuba, Guatemala, Nicaragua, and the United States during her lifetime. She gained Mexican citizenship through marriage to the painter Rodolfo Zanabria. She died in Mexico City, Mexico.

== Selected works ==
- Los elementos terrestres, 1948
- Zona en territorio del alba, 1953
- El tránsito de fuego, 1957
- El rastro de las mariposas, 1970
- Territorio del alba y otros poemas, 1974
- Eunice Odio Antología, 1975

=== Translations ===
- The Fire's Journey, Part I: Integration of the Parents (Tavern Books, 2013)
- The Fire's Journey, Part II: Creation of Myself (Tavern Books, 2015)
- The Fire's Journey, Part III: The Cathedral's Work (Tavern Books, 2018)
- The Fire's Journey, Part IV: The Return (Tavern Books, 2019)
