= Francisco Rodríguez Barrientos =

Francisco Rodríguez Barrientos (born 1956) is a Costa Rican writer and sociologist.

== Early life and education ==
Francisco Rodríguez Barrientos was born in 1956. He grew up in San Carlos, a rural county in the northern plains of Costa Rica. He holds a licentura (Sociology) from the University of Costa Rica. Rodriguez teaches sociology at the Costa Rica Institute of Technology. Although he has published articles and books on sociological elements of development, he is chiefly known as writer of aphorisms and a poet.

== Aphorisms ==
The main body of aphorisms' books of Rodríguez Barrientos includes, among others, the following titles: "Tardes de domingo" (Ediciones Perro Azul, 2003), "El ángel de la salmuera" (Ediciones Perro Azul, 2004), "Serpigo" (Ediciones Perro Azul, 2005), "Fauces" (Ediciones Arboleda, 2006) and "El sopor de la canícula" (Ediciones Arboleda, 2007)., "Obsesión del asco" and "El resto es vicio" (2016).
