= Luis Chaves =

Costa Rican poet

- Born: 1969 (age 56–57); San José, Costa Rica
- Occupations: Poet, prose writer, translator

Luis Chaves (born in 1969), is a Costa Rican poet, considered one of the leading figures in contemporary Costa Rican poetry.

== Life and career ==
After studying agronomy at the University of Costa Rica, Chaves began to work as a free-lance writer. His first collection of poems, El Anónimo, was published by Editorial Guayacán in 1996. In 1997 his second poetry collection, Los animales que imaginamos, won the Sor Juana Inés de la Cruz Poetry Award. Historias Polaroid was published in 2001 to critical and public acclaim, and it was shortlisted for the poetry prize at the International Poetry Festival of Medellín, Colombia, that year. During a sojourn in Buenos Aires, Argentina, Chaves published his fourth book, Chan Marshall, which marked his rise as one of Latin America's leading young poetic voices. Chan Marshall won the III Fray Luis de León Poetry Prize and was published in Spain by the influential poetry publisher Visor. Chaves's latest book of poetry is Asfalto. A Road Poem, in which the author experiments more openly with prose poems and internal narrative. Some of his poems have been translated into Italian by Raffaella Raganella, and those translations received an international prize from the Fondazione Cassa di Risparmio di Ascoli Piceno. In 2009, Ediciones Perro Azul published an expanded, commemorative edition of Historias Polaroid and Asfalto in a single volume. In 2010 Chaves published two collections of prose: El mundial 2010. Apuntes, published by Germinal, which contains chronicles of every game of the 2010 Soccer World Cup in South Africa; and 300 Páginas. Prosas, published by Lanzallamas, which includes Chaves's press articles written for different magazines and newspapers in Costa Rica and abroad between 2002 and 2010. Chaves was editor of Los Amigos de lo Ajeno, a poetry magazine distributed mainly in Costa Rica and Argentina.

== Works ==
=== Poetry ===
- El Anónimo / The Anonymous (1996)
- Los animales que imaginamos / The Animals We Imagine (1997)
- Historias Polaroid / Polaroid Stories (2001)
- Cumbia / Cumbia (2003)
- Chan Marshall / Chan Marshall (2005)
- Asfalto. Un Road Poem / Asphalt. A Road Poem (2006)

=== Prose ===
- El mundial 2010. Apuntes / The 2010 World Cup. Notes (2010)
- 300 páginas / 300 Pages (2010)

=== Anthologies ===
- Antología de la nueva poesía costarricense / Anthology of the New Costa Rican Poetry (2001)
