= José León Sánchez =

Costa Rican novelist (1929–2022)

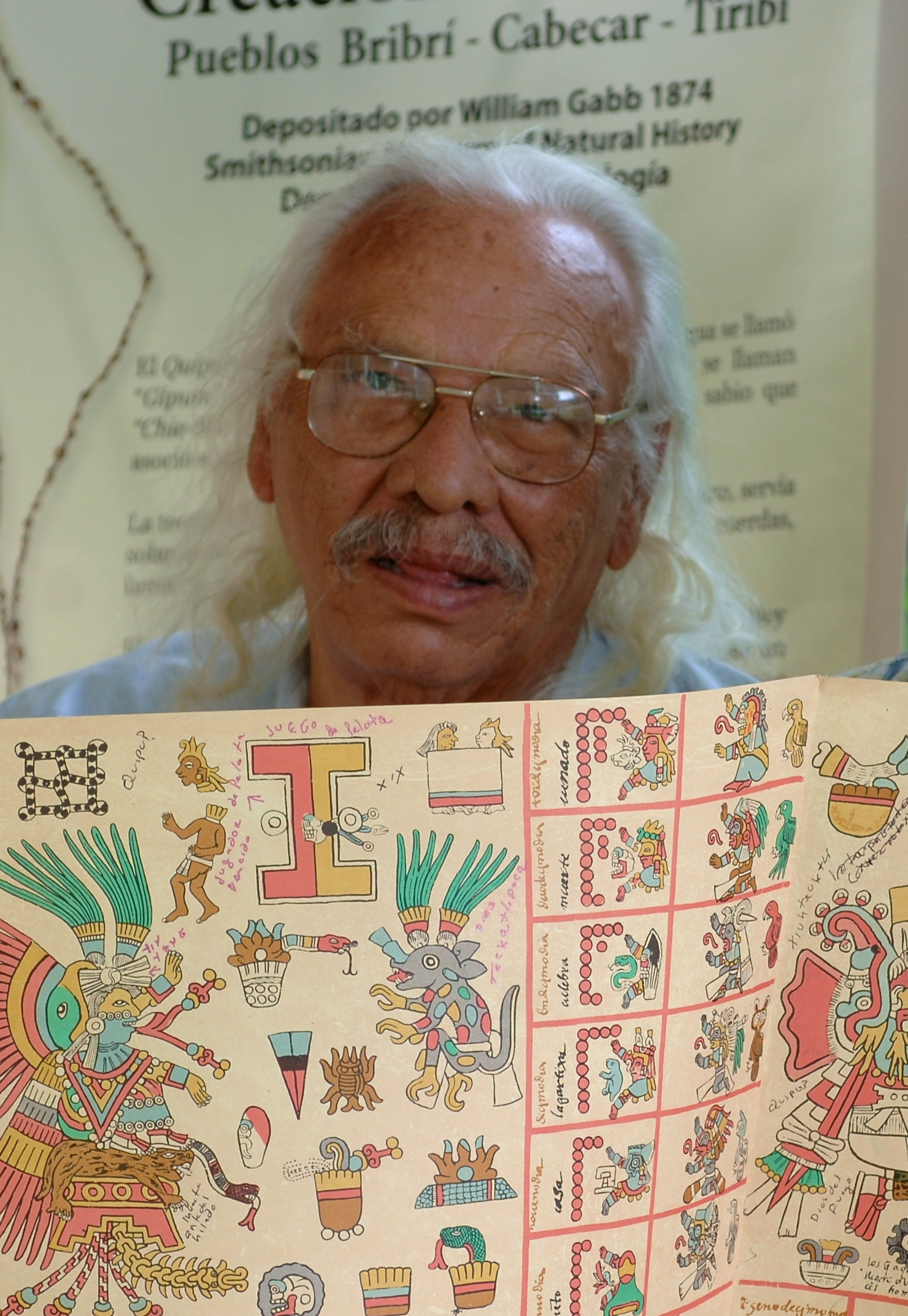
- Sánchez holding a copy of the Codex Borbonicus in 2014
- Born: 19 April 1929; Cucaracho de Río Cuarto, Costa Rica
- Died: 15 November 2022 (aged 93); Heredia, Costa Rica
- Occupations: Novelist, writer
- Notable work: La isla de los hombres solos, Tenochtitlán: la última batalla de los aztecas
- Awards: Premio Nacional de Cultura Magón (2017)

José León Sánchez Alvarado (19 April 1929 – 15 November 2022) was a Costa Rican novelist best known for his works Isla de los hombres solos ("Island of Lonely Men") and Tenochtitlan. A movie adaptation of his novel, Isla de los hombres solos was made and released by a Mexican producer.

== Early life ==
Sánchez was born on April 19, 1929, in Río Cuarto, a rural area of Costa Rica. He grew up in conditions of poverty and instability, spending part of his childhood in institutional care after being abandoned at an early age.

In 1950, he became implicated in the robbery of jewels from the Basílica de los Ángeles in Cartago, a crime that attracted national attention due to its religious significance and the killing of a guard. According to his later account, he unknowingly transported stolen items and subsequently confessed under pressure, which contributed to his conviction.

== Imprisonment ==
At the age of 19, Sánchez was sentenced and sent to the penal colony on San Lucas Island in the Gulf of Nicoya. The prison, established in 1873, became known for harsh discipline and inhumane conditions, housing some of the most stigmatized prisoners in the country.

Sánchez spent decades incarcerated there, including long periods in isolation under severe conditions. He attempted escape on several occasions and was injured during at least one attempt. His case received wide publicity, and he became widely stigmatised in the media.

Throughout his imprisonment, Sánchez maintained that he was innocent. His conviction was overturned decades later, when the Supreme Court of Costa Rica formally declared him innocent of the crime.

== Literary career ==
While in prison, Sánchez learned to read and write, initially with the help of other inmates, and began composing texts despite limited access to materials. Writing became both a means of intellectual development and a response to the conditions of incarceration.

His best-known work, La isla de los hombres solos (The Island of Lonely Men), was written during his imprisonment and published in the 1960s. The novel draws on his experiences in San Lucas and presents a depiction of prison life marked by violence, deprivation and institutional abuse. The book achieved international circulation, was translated into multiple languages and adapted into a film.

Over the course of his career, Sánchez produced numerous novels, short stories and essays. Among his notable works is Tenochtitlán: la última batalla de los aztecas (Tenochtitlán: the last battle of the Aztecs), which reconstructs the Spanish conquest of Mexico from the perspective of the defeated Indigenous population. His writing frequently addressed themes of injustice, marginalisation, and historical reinterpretation.

His works were translated into several languages and reached a wide readership, with millions of copies sold. He received multiple literary distinctions, including national awards and an honorary doctorate from the National Autonomous University of Mexico.

== Later life ==
After his release, Sánchez spent periods living in Mexico and the United States before returning to Costa Rica. He remained active as a writer and commentator, contributing opinion articles and participating in cultural debates.

Despite his recognition, Sánchez continued to speak about the long-term impact of his conviction and the stigma associated with it. In 2017, he was awarded the Premio Nacional de Cultura Magón, Costa Rica’s highest cultural distinction. He also received international recognition, including human rights-related honours.

== Death ==
José León Sánchez died on November 15, 2022, after a period of hospitalisation in Heredia following multiple heart attacks. He was 93 years old at the time of his death.

His death prompted public tributes in Costa Rica and abroad, reflecting his status as a widely read and influential literary figure.

== Selected bibliography ==
- La isla de los hombres solos
- Tenochtitlán: la última batalla de los aztecas
- Campanas para llamar al viento
- Cuando canta el caracol
- La niña que vino de la luna
