= Editorial Costa Rica =

Costa Rican publishing house

The Editorial Costa Rica is a National Law Publishing House in Costa Rica, established on June 10, 1959. It focuses on the publication of works by Costa Ricans and the enrichment of the country's culture in literature.

The Editorial's first publication was the book "Throughout My Life" by Carlos Gagini in 1961.

Its advisory board is composed of three representatives named by the Assembly of Authors, one representative from the National University of Costa Rica, one from the University of Costa Rica, two from the Executive Branch appointed through the Ministry of Culture, Youth and Sports, and two from the Ministry of Public Education.

Every two years three literary contests are held: the Editorial Costa Rica Prize, the Carmen Lyra Prize, and the Youth Creation Prize. Each prize is awarded in a different literary genre between various works entered in the competition.
