= Limón =

Capital city of Limón, Costa Rica

- District and city
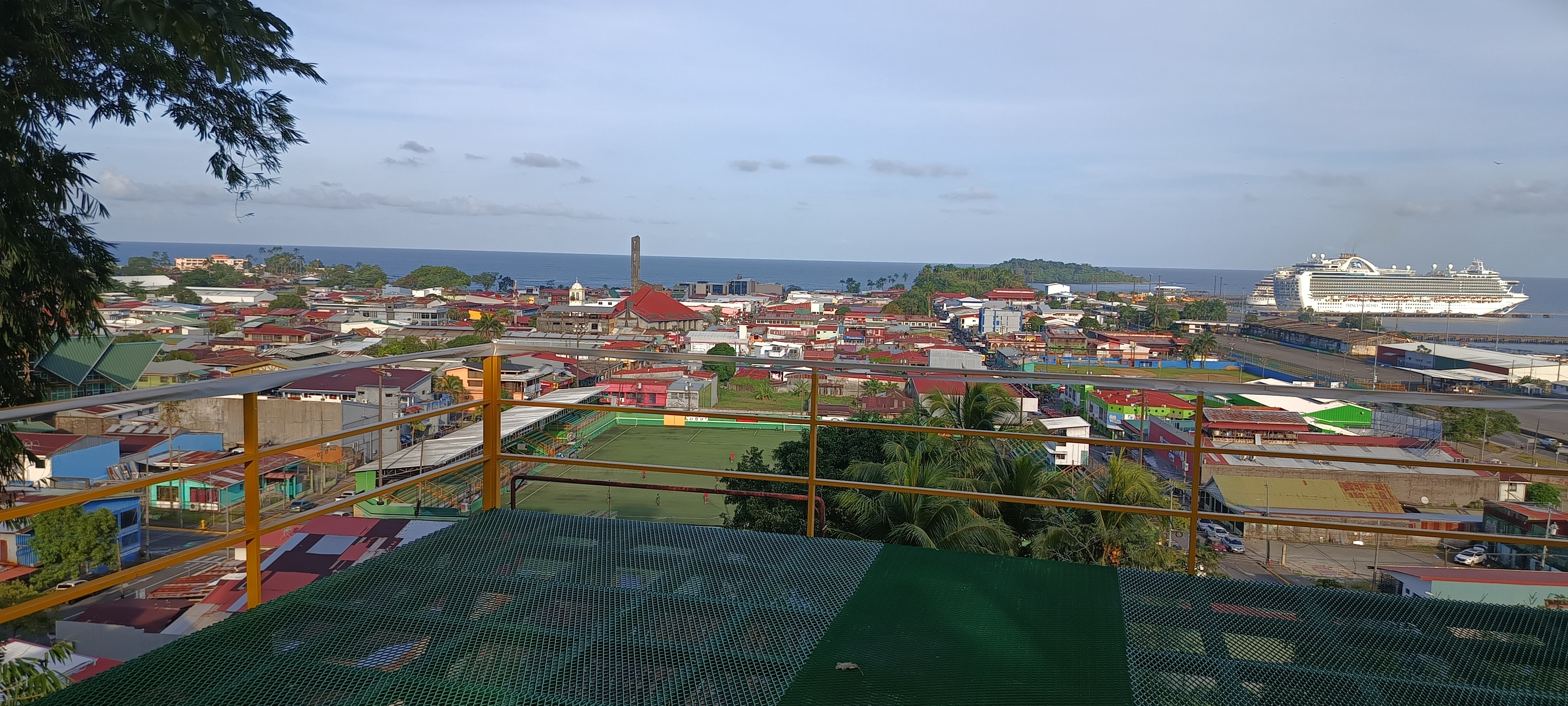
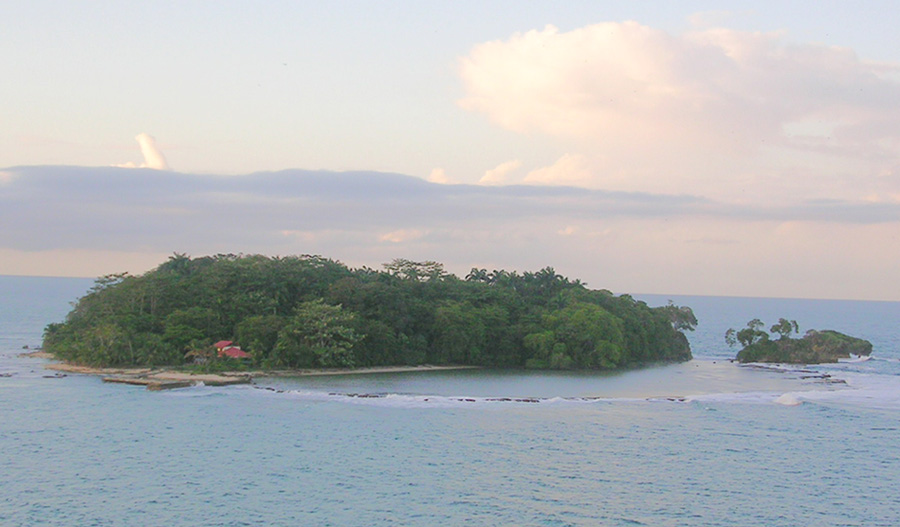
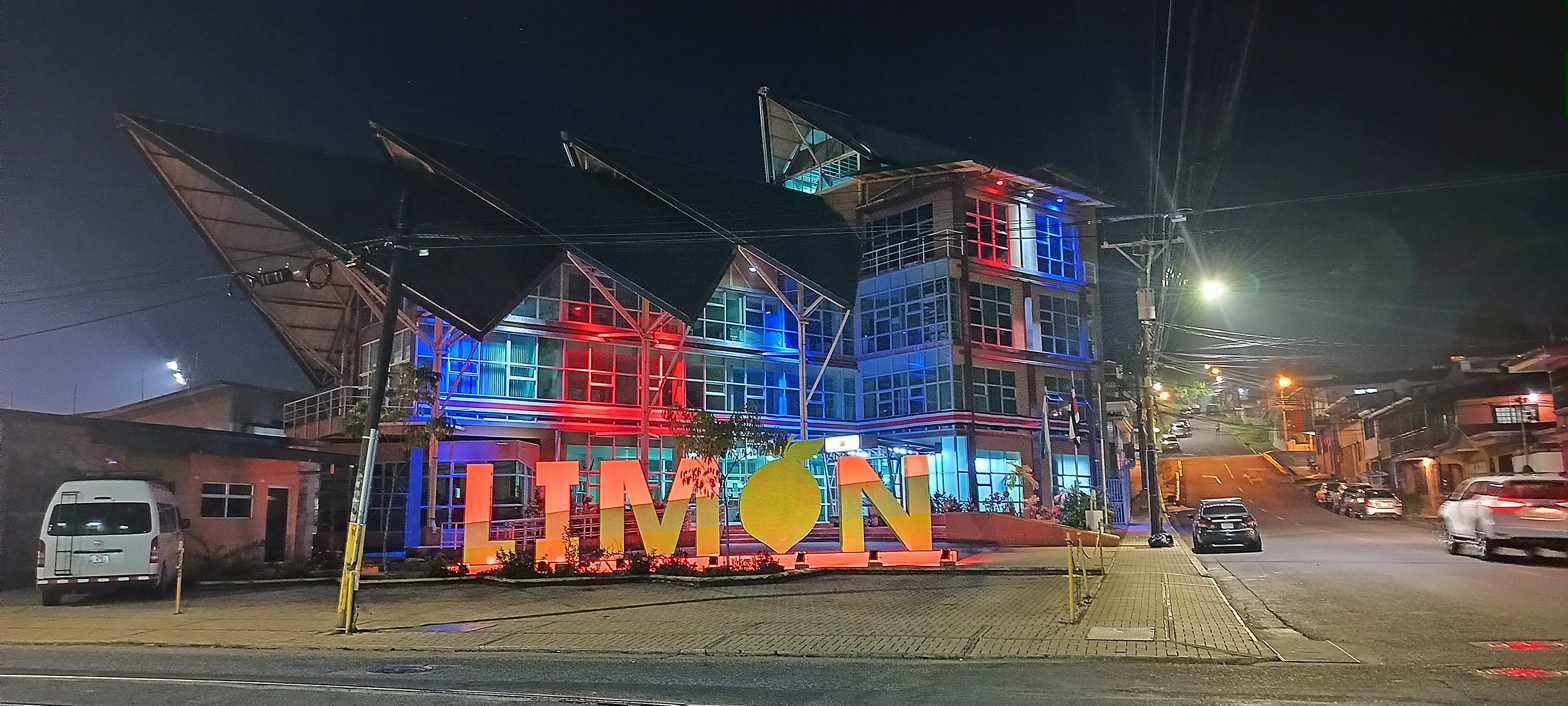
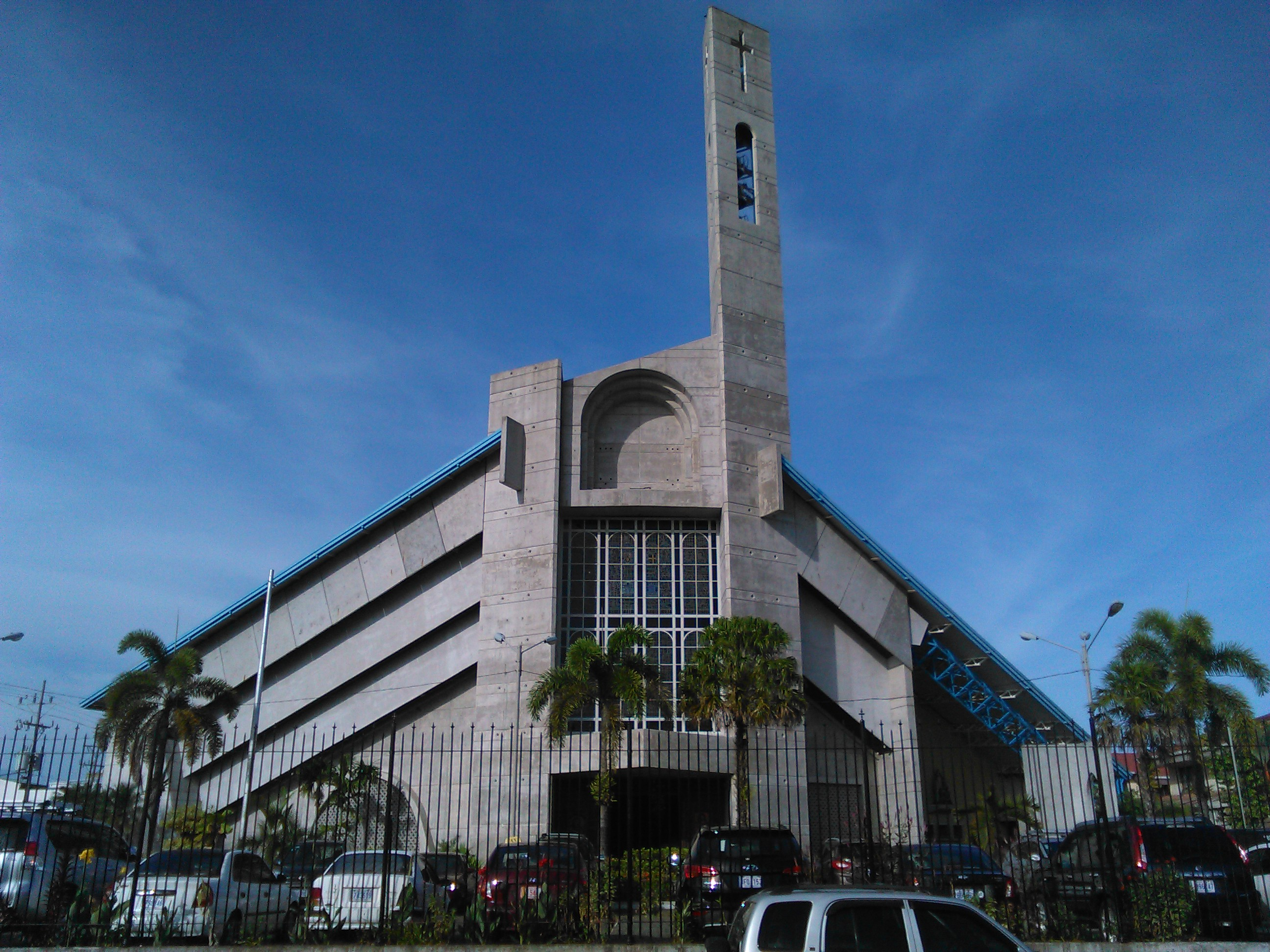
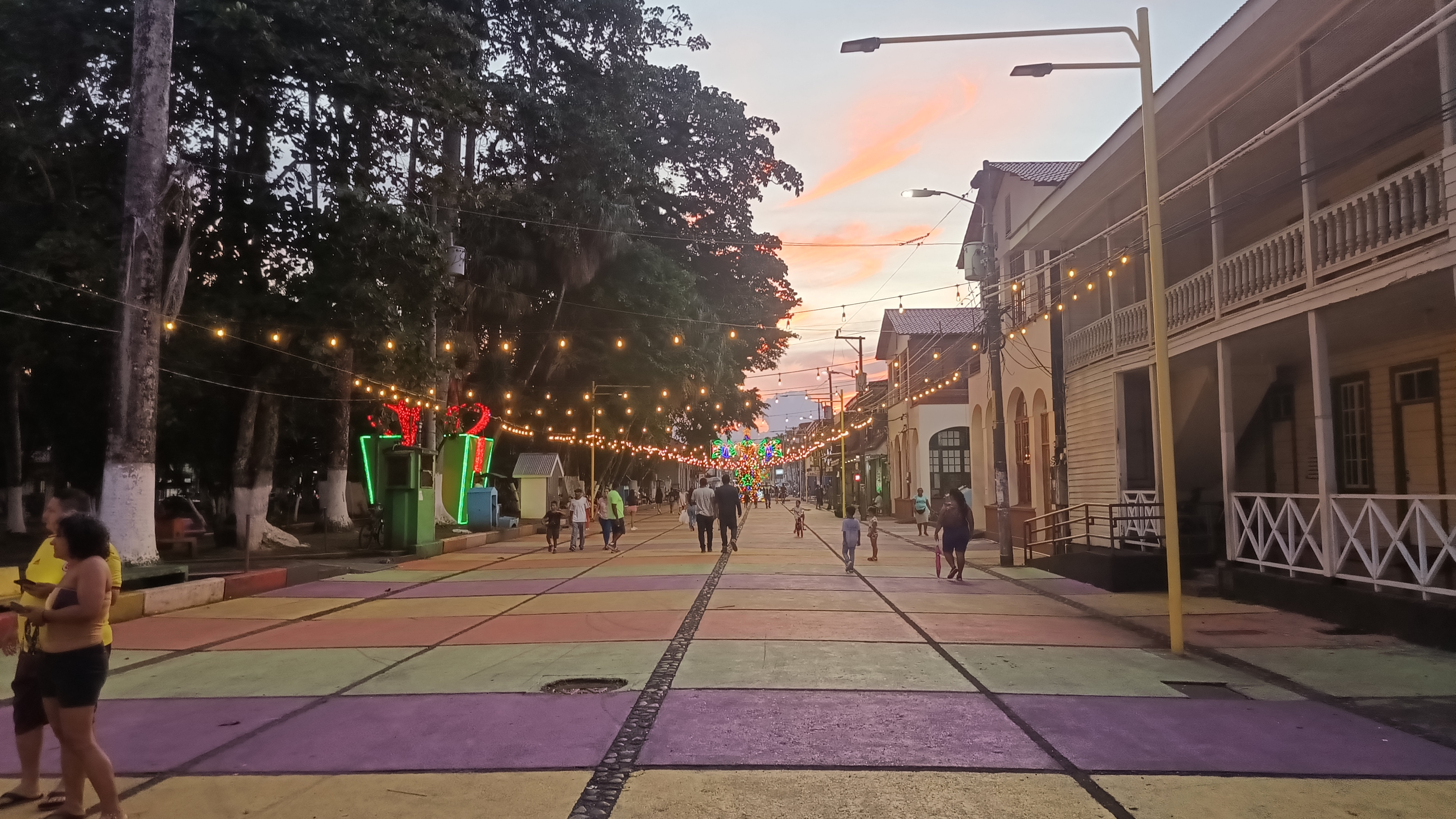
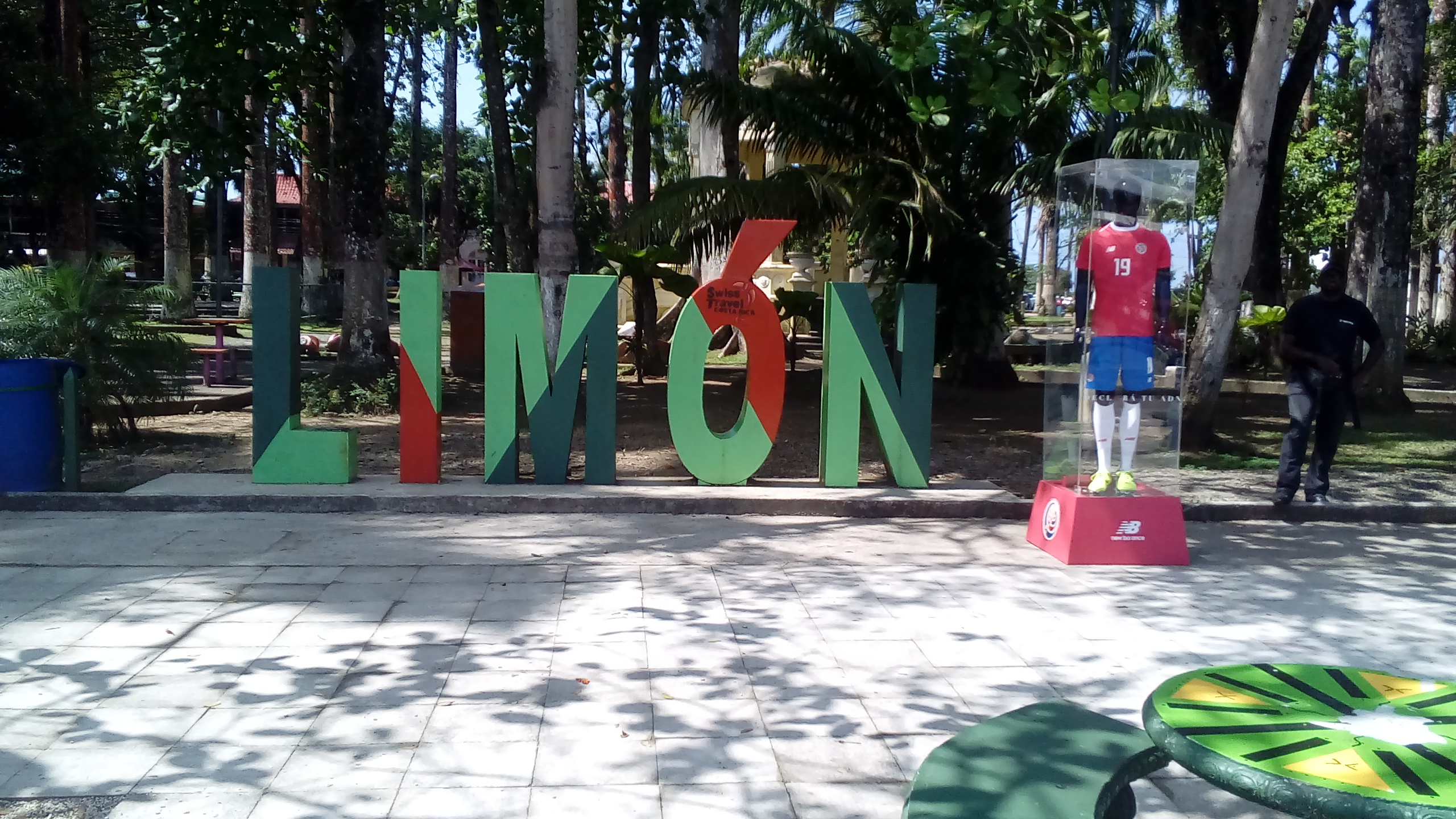
- View of downtown Limón The Uvita Island Town hall City cathedral The Balvanero Vargas park City wordmark during an exhibition of the Costa Rica uniform for the 2018 FIFA World Cup

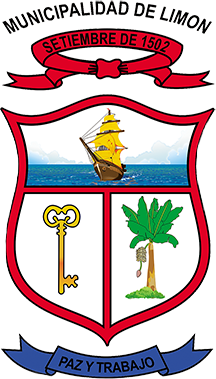
- Flag Coat of arms Wordmark
- Mottoes: Paz y Trabajo; (Peace and Work); Ciudad de la vida; (City of Life)
- Interactive map of Limón
- Location of Puerto Limón within Costa Rica
- Coordinates: 10.0022155°N 83.0840367°W
- Country: Costa Rica
- Province: Limón
- Canton: Limón
- Founded: 1854
- Declared as district: 1870
- Founder: Philipp J. J. Valentini
- Named for: Lemon (Citrus × limon)

Government
  - Mayor: Ana Matarrita McCalla
  - Syndic: Marco Luna

Area
  - District and city: 59.51 km^{2} (22.98 sq mi)
- Elevation: 3 m (9.8 ft)

Population (2020)
  - District and city: 61,135
  - Estimate (2026): 124,783
  - Rank: 5th (Agglomeration)
  - Density: 1,027/km^{2} (2,661/sq mi)
  - Urban: 52,337
- Demonym: limonense
- Time zone: UTC−06:00
- Postal code: 70101
- Climate: Af
- Website: municlimon.go.cr

Limón (Spanish pronunciation: [liˈmon]), also known as Puerto Limón, is the capital city of both the province and canton of the same name. One of Costa Rica's seven "middle cities" (i.e., main cities outside of San José's Greater Metropolitan Area), Limón has a population of 71,514, which made it, as of 2022, the most-populous city in the country outside of the Greater Metropolitan Area and the second most-populous district in the nation.

Founded in 1854 by Philipp J. J. Valentini and officially established as a district in 1870 during the Liberal State, Limón is the only planned city in the country built in the 19th century. Located in the Caribbean coast, its purpose was to become the country's main port, a role the city still retains to this day, given its strategic location in the Caribbean Sea, close to the Panama Canal, to connect Costa Rica with North America, South America, the Caribbean, and Europe. The Moín Container Terminal, operated by Dutch-based APM Terminals, and the nearby Port of Moín, operated by the state-institution JAPDEVA, serve as the main economic ports for the country. The Port of Limón, located just South downtown, receives both cargo and cruise ships, though plans to convert it into a passenger terminal are underway.

The city is of historical significance for the country, as it was one of Christopher Columbus' moorings during his fourth and last voyage. On 25 September 1502, Colón recalls landing on a town named by the locals as Cariay, with the nearby Quiribrí island just offshore.

Today, Limón is recognized as one of Costa Rica's most culturally and racially diverse cities. It is one of the main communities of Afro-Costa Ricans in the country, mainly as a result of people of Jamaican descent arriving for the construction of the Atlantic railroad in the country, and a subsequent travel ban from the central government, which limited people of Afro-Caribbean origin to move outside of the Limón Province. Aside from Spanish, the Afro-Costa Rican community also speaks the English-based Limonese Creole.

Limón faces numerous problems, with the main one being the skyrocketing crime, as drug cartels confluence in the city due to its port being an important part of their drug-trafficking schemes, resulting in an alarming murder rate.

== Toponymy ==
Puerto Limón is Spanish for port lemon. The city is homonymous to both the canton and province. Along with Guanacaste, Limón is one of the locations in the country that owes its name to a plant.

A previous name for the location was Cariay or Cariai, a name used by the aboriginal tribes from pre-Hispanic era up to the arrival of Christopher Columbus.

The origins of the name Limón are unknown, but by 1852, then-Costa Rican president Juan Rafael Mora Porras referred to the port as Puerto del Limón (Port of the Lemon).

== History ==
=== Colony ===
Christopher Columbus first dropped anchor in Costa Rica in 1502 at Isla Uvita, just off the coast of Puerto Limón. The Atlantic coast, however, was left largely unexplored by Spanish settlers until the 19th century.

As early as 1569, Governor Perafán de Rivera gave extensive plots of land, Indians included, in Matina to aristocrats (hidalgos) that helped to finance and support early conquest. Because these aristocrats found out that only a few Indians were available to exploit, they acquired African slaves to plant these lands with cocoa trees (the only feasible crop in these lands). These lands provided the only source of income to the absentee owners from the capital city of Cartago. Matina gained importance because of the cacao and the presence of African slaves, which made them attractive to pirate incursions. The Spanish left Costa Rica soon after arriving because of Costa Rica's lack of natural resources and isolation from the rest of the major colonial trade routes.

Notorious pirates, Edward Mansvelt and his vice admiral Henry Morgan, arrived at Portete, a small bay between Limón and Moín, in 1666. They proceeded inland to Cartago, the capital of Costa Rica at the time, but were driven away by the inhabitants at Turrialba on 15 April. The pirate army left on 16 April and arrived back in Portete on 23 April. They left Costa Rica and did not return.

=== Foundation ===
The town was officially founded in 1854 by Philipp J. J. Valentini under government auspices. In 1867, construction began on an ambitious railroad connecting the highlands to the sea. Limón was chosen as the site of a major port, which would facilitate exports of coffee from the Central Valley.

=== Recent history ===
During World War II, as part of the Operation Neuland, German U-boat U-161 attacked San Pablo, a ship that was being unloaded in Limón, on 3 July 1942. The attack killed twenty-three dockers and one crew member, whose bodies took around three weeks to be recovered.

As a district, Limón was last modified on 10 August 1992, by Executive Decree 21515-G.

Puerto Limón was heavily struck by the 1991 Limon earthquake, whose epicenter was located in the neighboring Valle La Estrella district. It elevated the coastline by around 1.85 meters in some areas of Limón, cracked the streets open, and destroyed many buildings, most notably the Las Olas Hotel, located in the northern shore of the city.

== Geography ==
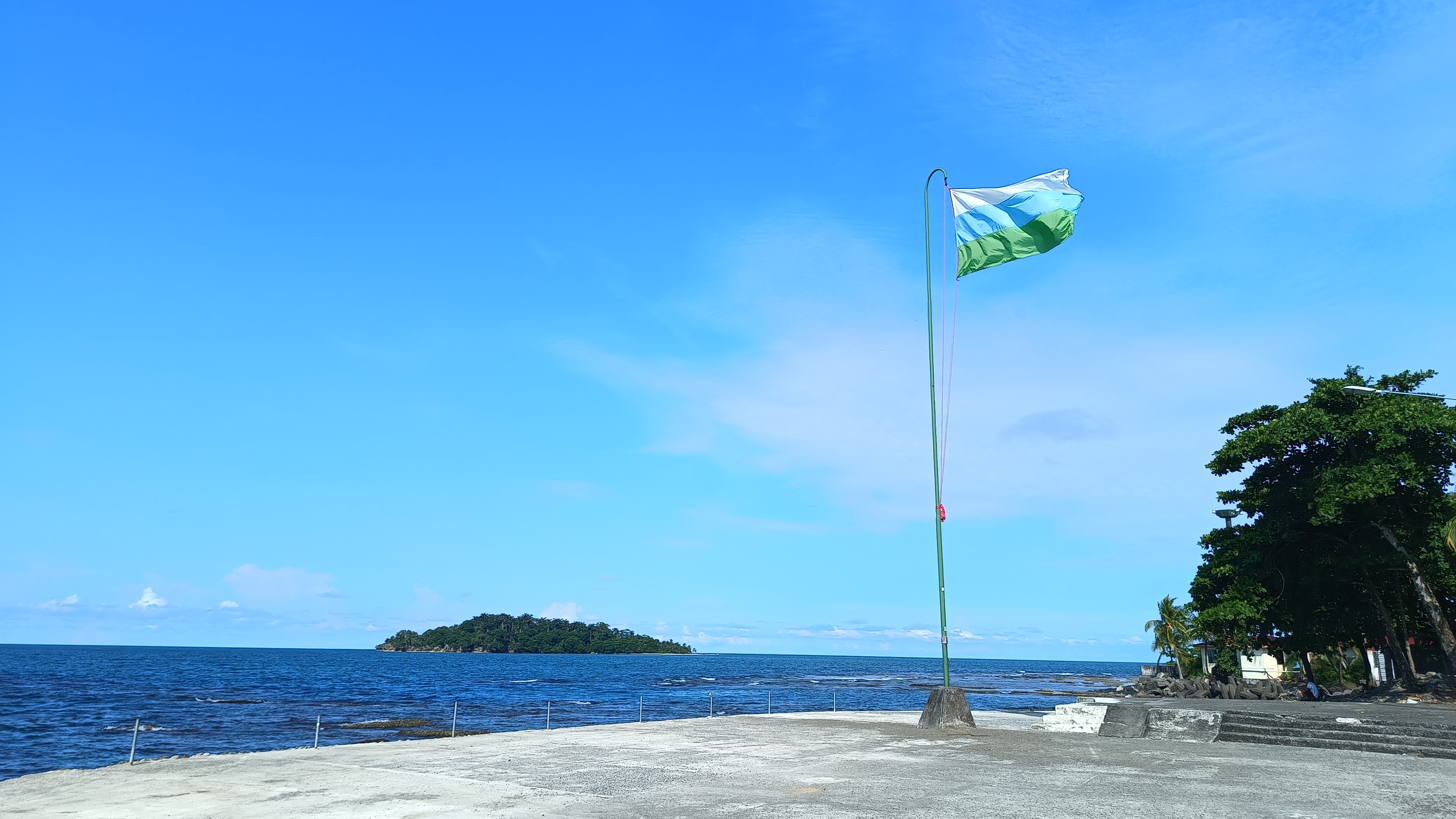
A Limonese flag hoisted in the Balvanero Vargas park, with the Uvita Island in the background

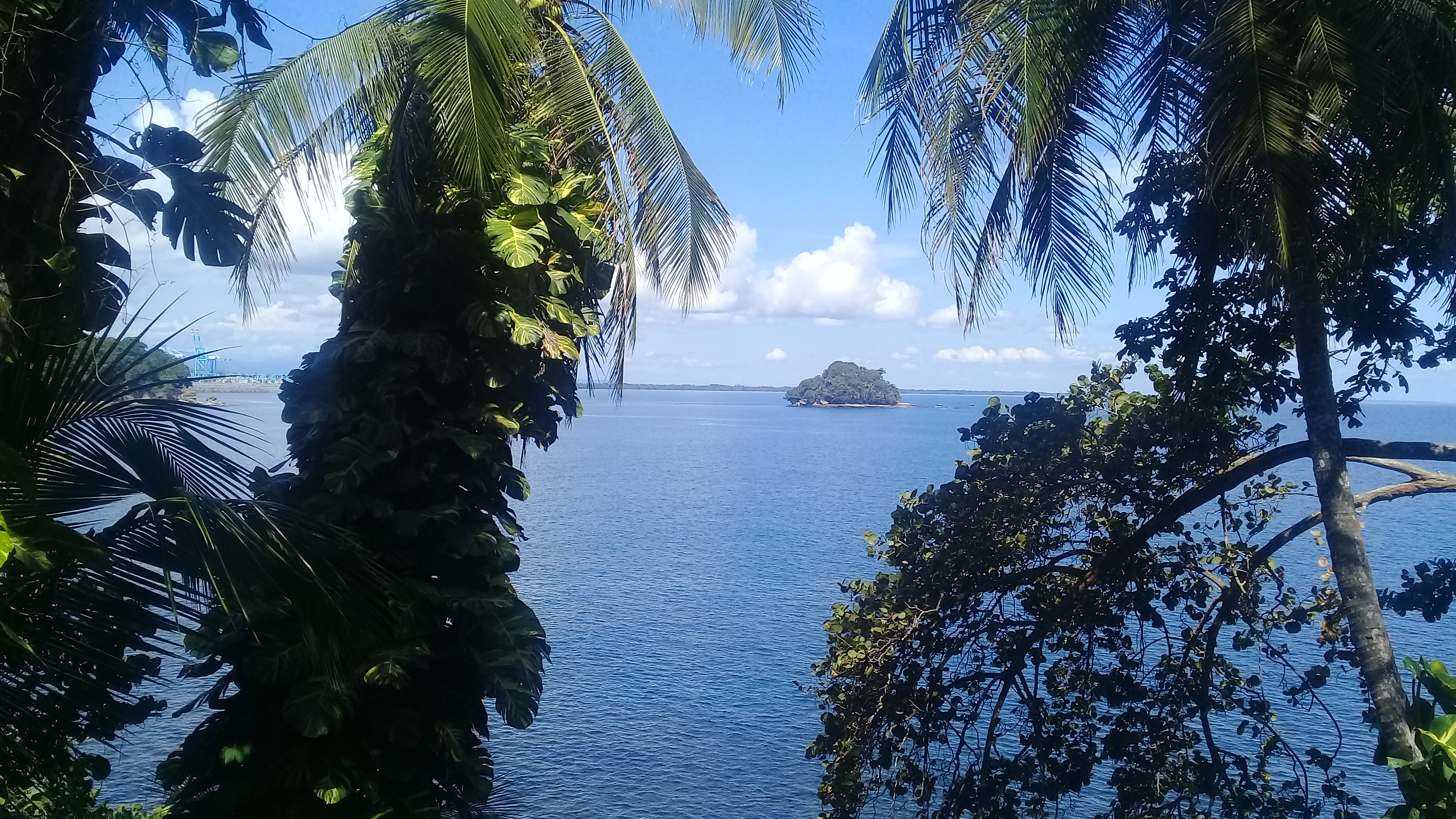
Isla de Pájaros, seen from the Cariari Park, North side of the city

Limón is situated on a cape along the Caribbean coast of Costa Rica, on the East side of the country. South of the National Route 32, two rivers converge into their drainage into the Caribbean Sea: the Limoncito and the Cieneguita rivers, both of which are surrounded by numerous neighborhoods.

Two islands surround the city. The Uvita Island is less than a kilometer East of downtown Limón, while the smaller Isla de Pájaros (Birds Island) lies just north of the nearby Bonita Beach.

The district has an area of 59.51 square kilometres (22.98 square miles) and an elevation of three metres (9.8 feet)

=== Locations ===
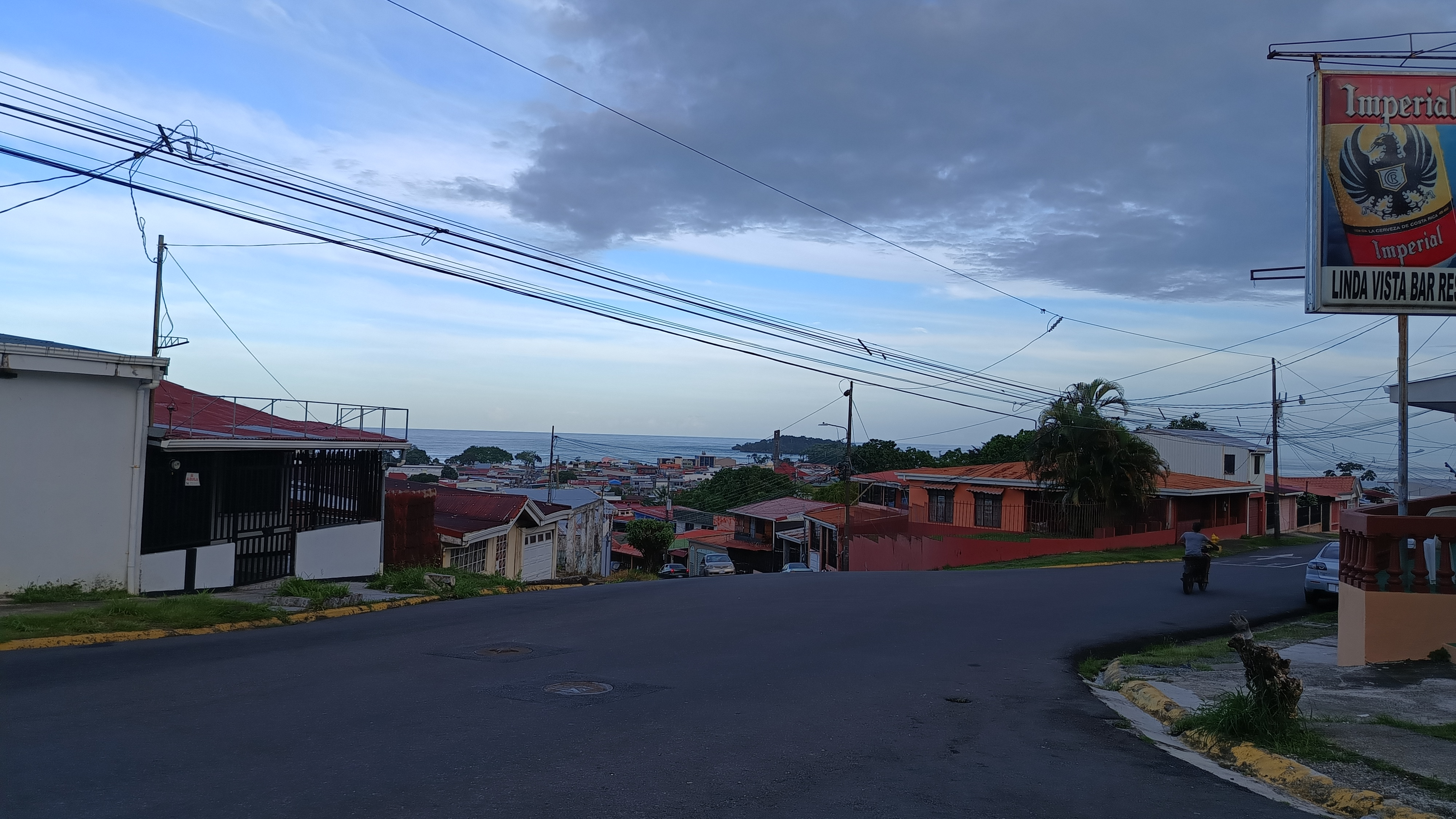
The Siglo XXI neighborhood provides a panoramic view of downtown Limón, the Uvita Island, and the Caribbean Sea

Limón is divided into neighborhoods (barrios) and villages (poblados or villas).

The barrios are as follows:

1. Bellavista
2. Bohío
3. El Bosque
4. Cangrejos
5. Cariari
6. Cerro Mocho
7. Cielo Amarillo
8. Cieneguita
9. Colina
10. Los Corales #1

11. Los Corales #2
12. Los Corales #3
13. El Cruce
14. Fortín
15. Garrón
16. Hospital
17. Jamaica Town
18. JAPDEVA
19. Los Laureles
20. Limoncito

21. Los Lirios
22. Moín
23. Piuta
24. Portete
25. Pueblo Nuevo
26. San Juan
27. Santa Eduviges
28. Siglo XXI
29. Trinidad
30. Veracruz

The poblados are as follows:

1. Buenos Aires
2. Cocal
3. Dos Bocas
4. Empalme Moín
5. Milla Nueve

6. Santa Rosa
7. Valle la Aurora
8. Villa del Mar #1
9. Villa del Mar #2
10. Villa Hermosa

=== Climate ===
Limón features a trade wind tropical rainforest climate (Af) under Köppen's climate classification. Average temperatures are relatively consistent throughout the year averaging around 26 degrees Celsius (79 degrees Fahrenheit). Common to all cities with this climate, Limón has no consistently dry season. Its driest month (September) averages roughly 140 millimetres or 5.5 inches of rainfall while its wettest (December) averages just below 450 millimetres or 18 inches of rain. Limón averages nearly 3,600 millimetres or 140 inches of rainfall annually.

Climate data for Limón International Airport, Costa Rica
Month	Jan	Feb	Mar	Apr	May	Jun	Jul	Aug	Sep	Oct	Nov	Dec	Year
Record high °C (°F)	32.9 (91.2)	33.4 (92.1)	33.9 (93.0)	34.5 (94.1)	35.0 (95.0)	35.0 (95.0)	33.7 (92.7)	34.3 (93.7)	33.8 (92.8)	34.5 (94.1)	34.5 (94.1)	33.0 (91.4)	35.0 (95.0)
Mean daily maximum °C (°F)	28.8 (83.8)	29.1 (84.4)	29.7 (85.5)	30.1 (86.2)	30.4 (86.7)	30.3 (86.5)	29.6 (85.3)	30.1 (86.2)	30.6 (87.1)	30.4 (86.7)	29.4 (84.9)	28.9 (84.0)	29.8 (85.6)
Daily mean °C (°F)	24.8 (76.6)	24.9 (76.8)	25.5 (77.9)	26.1 (79.0)	26.6 (79.9)	26.6 (79.9)	26.1 (79.0)	26.3 (79.3)	26.6 (79.9)	26.4 (79.5)	25.7 (78.3)	25.1 (77.2)	25.9 (78.6)
Mean daily minimum °C (°F)	20.7 (69.3)	20.7 (69.3)	21.2 (70.2)	22.0 (71.6)	22.8 (73.0)	22.9 (73.2)	22.6 (72.7)	22.5 (72.5)	22.5 (72.5)	22.3 (72.1)	21.9 (71.4)	21.2 (70.2)	21.9 (71.5)
Record low °C (°F)	12.9 (55.2)	16.4 (61.5)	15.2 (59.4)	17.4 (63.3)	17.8 (64.0)	20.0 (68.0)	16.6 (61.9)	19.0 (66.2)	18.9 (66.0)	19.2 (66.6)	15.8 (60.4)	13.2 (55.8)	12.9 (55.2)
Average rainfall mm (inches)	319.7 (12.59)	237.3 (9.34)	208.5 (8.21)	263.0 (10.35)	333.5 (13.13)	289.0 (11.38)	426.3 (16.78)	303.2 (11.94)	142.1 (5.59)	207.1 (8.15)	400.6 (15.77)	445.0 (17.52)	3,575.3 (140.75)
Average rainy days (≥ 1.0 mm)	17	14	14	14	16	16	20	16	11	13	17	18	186
Average relative humidity (%)	87	86	85	85	87	87	89	87	86	87	88	88	87
Mean monthly sunshine hours	155	152.6	179.8	171	164.3	135	117.8	145.7	159	164.3	135	142.6	1,822.1
Mean daily sunshine hours	5.0	5.4	5.8	5.7	5.3	4.5	3.8	4.7	5.3	5.3	4.5	4.6	5.0
Source 1: Instituto Meteorologico Nacional (precipitation 1941–2012, temperatures 1970–2012, sun 1969–2012, humidity 1970–2012)
Source 2: Meteo Climat (extremes, 1941–present)

== Demographics ==
Historical population
Census	Pop.	±% p.a.
1883	637	—
1892	2,144	+14.44%
1927	15,624	+5.84%
1950	16,384	+0.21%
1963	29,039	+4.50%
1973	40,830	+3.47%
1984	52,602	+2.33%
2000	60,298	+0.86%
2011	61,072	+0.12%
2022	71,514	+1.45%
Source: Instituto Nacional de Estadística y Censos; Centro Centroamericano de Población

As of 2022, the population is 71,514, of whom 37,140 (51.9%) are male, and 34,374 (48.1%) are female, in a ratio of 1.11 men per woman. The population density of 1,208.4/km^{2}

The National Institute of Statistics and Census of Costa Rica projects that Limón will be one of the most impacted districts in the country in terms of population loss by 2050, shrinking by an approximate of 14,000 inhabitants.

=== Afro-Costa Ricans ===
The first officially acknowledged arrival of African people who arrived in Costa Rica came with the Spanish conquistadors. Slave trading was common in all the countries conquered by Spain, and in Costa Rica, the first Africans seem to have come from specific sources in Africa– Equatorial and Western regions. The people from these areas were thought of as ideal slaves because they had a reputation for being more robust, affable, and hard-working than other Africans. The enslaved were from what is now the Gambia (Wolof), Guinea (Malinké), Ghanaian (Ashanti), Benin (specifically Ije / Ararás), and Sudan (Puras). Many of the enslaved were also Minas (i.e. communities from parts of the region extending from Ivory Coast to the Slave Coast), Popo (imported tribes such as Ana and Baribas), Yorubas and Congas (perhaps from Kongasso, Ivory Coast). Enslaved Africans also came from other places, such as neighboring Panama. Throughout the centuries, but especially after the emancipation of the slaves in 1824, the black population mixed with other ethnic groups, notably the Indians, and became part of the mainstream culture and ethnicity.

The early black population of Matina and Suerre in Limón is not the same population that arrived in the second half of the 19th century. This latter population did not arrive as slaves but as hired workers from Jamaica, and smaller groups from Barbados and Trinidad and Tobago. This is the reason why the majority of the current black population of Costa Rica has English surnames and speaks English with a Jamaican accent.

In 1910, Marcus Mosiah Garvey travelled to Puerto Limón, where he worked as a time-keeper for the United Fruit Company for some months, observing that the population of African descent suffered poor conditions.

The descendants of Africans in Costa Rica have endured discrimination including a delay in voting rights and a restriction on their movements.

== Education ==
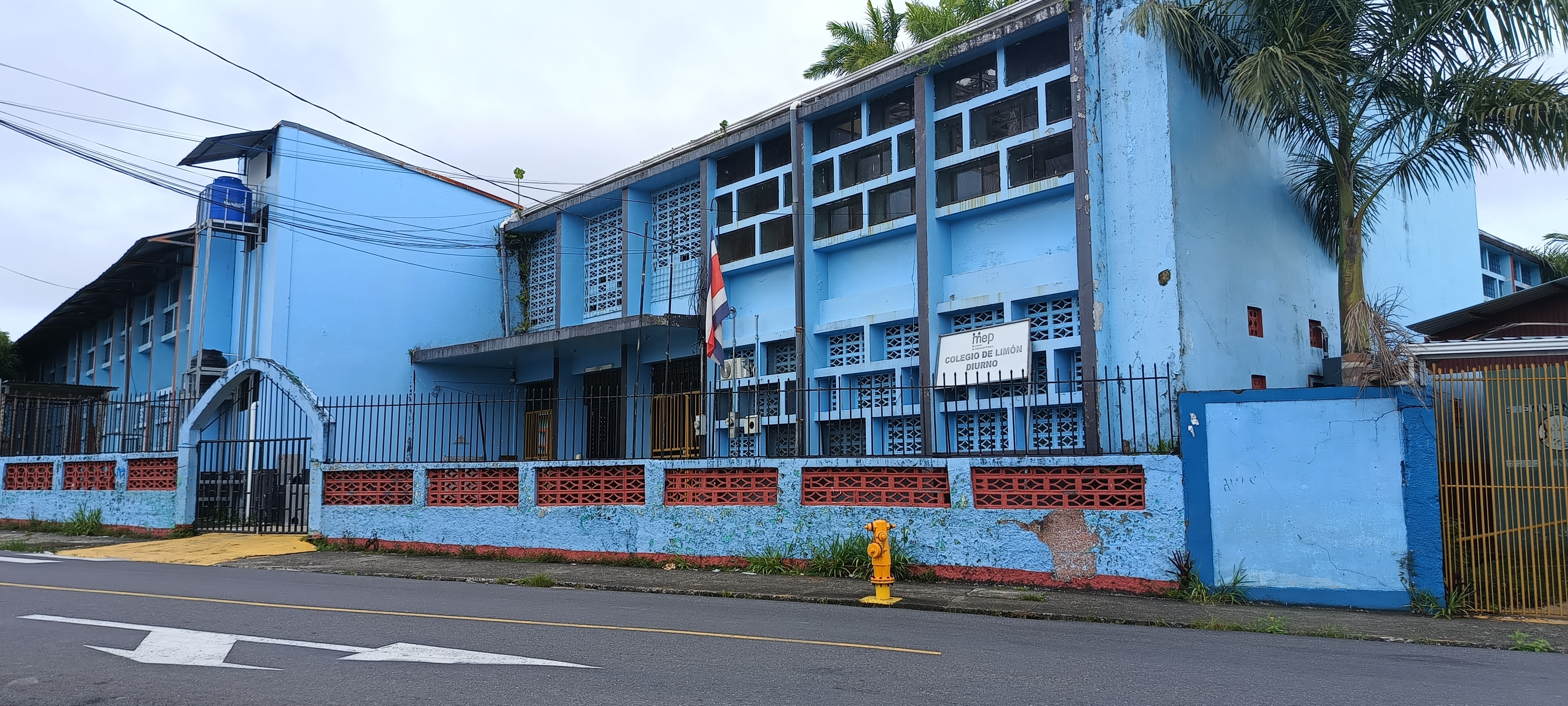
The Limón Day School is the oldest high school in the city

=== Primary and secondary schools ===
In 1877, after the city foundation, then-Costa Rican president Tomás Guardia Gutiérrez ordered the construction of a primary school, the Men's Higher School Institute. It was then renewed in further decades and renamed after Guardia. A women's school, named after Rafael Iglesias Castro, was inaugurated in 1922.

The first secondary school was inaugurated in 1945, the Colegio de Limón, eventually renamed Colegio de Limón Diurno (Limón Day School) to differentiate it from other high schools that appeared in later decades, particularly the Colegio Nocturno de Limón (Limón Night School), which uses the same campus as the Day School but has a different administration. Those schools include the Colegio Técnico Profesional de Limón (Limón Professional-Technical School), the Liceo Nuevo de Limón (Limón New Lyceum), eventually renamed Liceo Mario Bourne after its founder and first principal, the Colegio Deportivo de Limón (Limón Sports School), and the Colegio de Pacuare, named after the neighborhood it is located in.

Limón's public education schools often struggle due to poor infrastructure and low public support. The Limón Sports School is a primary example of this, as the school abandoned its previous installations in the Pacuare neighborhood (which were eventually overtaken by the Pacuare High School) and moved to Limón's New Stadium or JAPDEVA's installations in downtown Limón.

In 2002, the Scientific High School of Limón was inaugurated, and has since been run by the Distance State University at the local campus.

=== Higher education ===
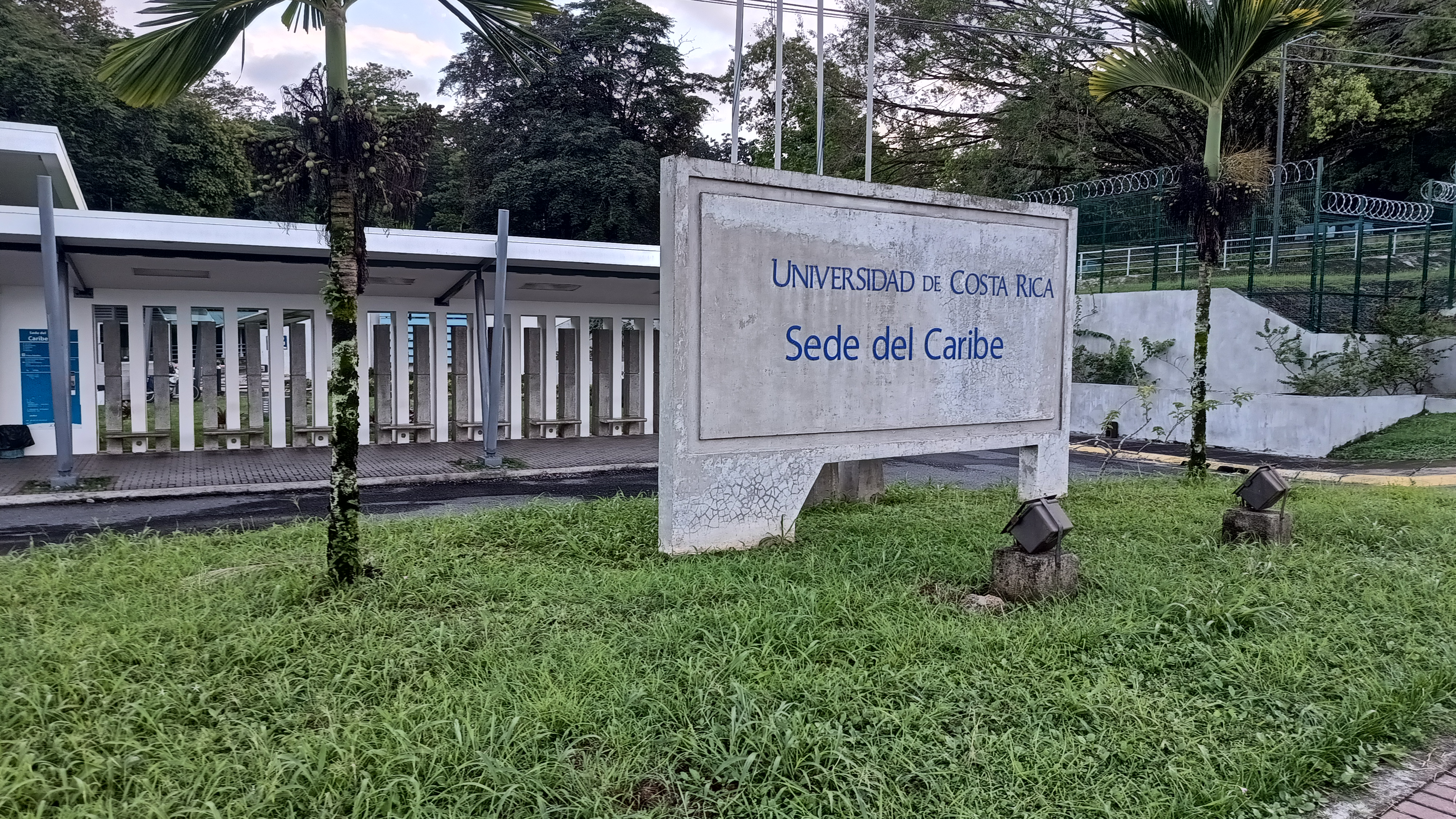
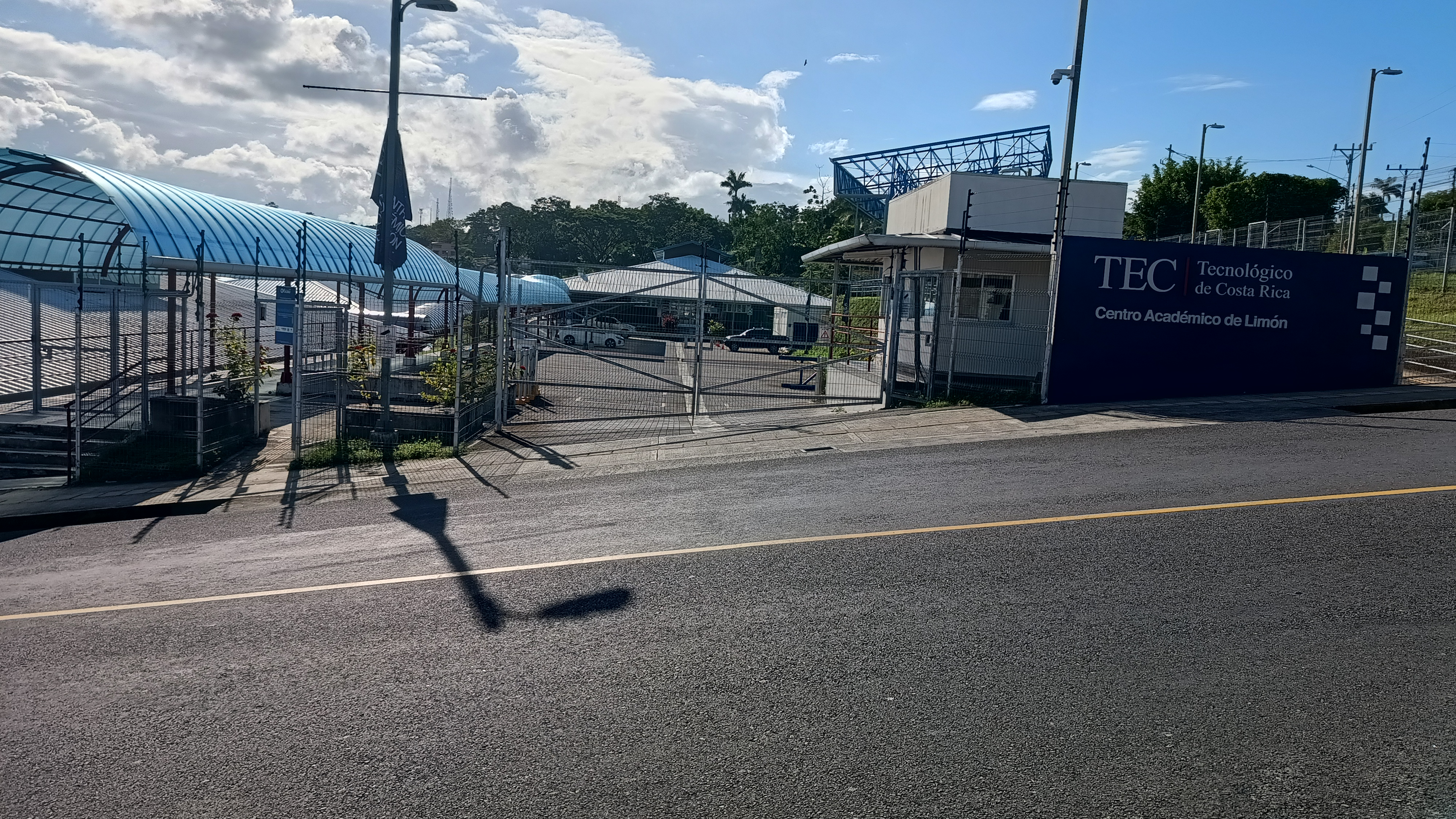
Campuses in Limón for both the University of Costa Rica (left) and the Costa Rica Institute of Technology (right)

Limón is home to numerous universities. Out of the five public universities in the country, three have a campus in Limón: the University of Costa Rica (UCR) and the Distance State University (UNED) have their campuses along Route 32, while the Costa Rica Institute of Technology (ITCR or TEC) is located downtown, in front of the Limón Day School.

Another institution is the University College of Limón (CUNLIMÓN), a public-funded, semi-autonomous university founded in 2002.

Moreover, some private universities also have a building in Limón, namely the Autonomous University of Central America (UACA), the Castro Carazo University, and the Free University of Costa Rica (ULICORI).

== Politics ==
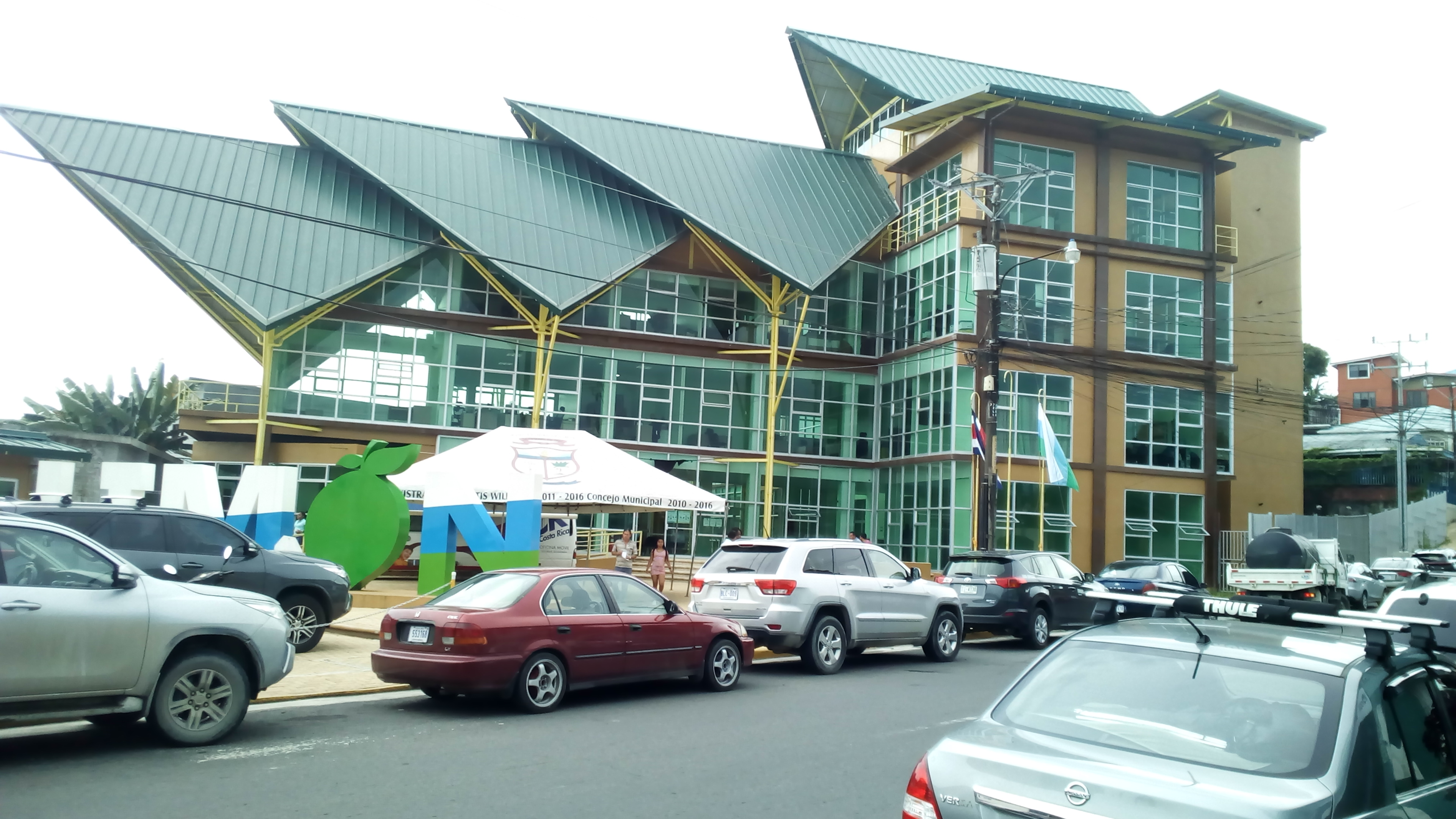
Limón's town hall

Since 2024, Ana Matarrita McCalla serves as the mayor of the Limón canton, working from the city hall in downtown Limón. McCalla initially assumed her role following the resignation of Néstor Mattis in January 2024. She was already a candidate for the municipal elections that took place a month later, winning and extending her governing period until 2028, becoming the first female mayor-elect in the city.

== Economy ==
Limón is Costa Rica's main port, as nearly 90% of the country's imports and exports move through the two harbors located in Moín.

== Transport ==
Two main highways serve Limón. The National Route 32 is one of the country's primary roads, and connects Limón to the Greater Metropolitan Area. One of the route ends is located just next to the Balvanero Vargas park. Because of Limón's situation as the country's main port, Route 32 is the most important route for exportations in Costa Rica, accounting for around 83% of national exports. Close to its Eastern end, Route 32 is crossed by Route 36, another of Costa Rica's primary roads. This route connects Limón to the neighboring districts of Matama and Valle La Estrella, to the Talamanca canton, and in turn, to Panama through the Sixaola River bridge.

Three secondary routes are located in Limón, all of which are connected to Route 32. Route 240 encloses the northern portion of the city, while Route 241 encloses the southern portion, extending further South until meeting Route 36 in Bananito. Route 257 connects Route 32 with the Moín Container Terminal.

Limón is also served by the Limón International Airport (Spanish: Aeropuerto Internacional Pablo Zidar, Limón), IATA code LIO, an airstrip which is 1,800 m (5,900 ft) long by 30 m (98 ft) wide, two m (6.6 ft) above sea level, on the coast south of the city.

== Culture ==
=== Architecture ===
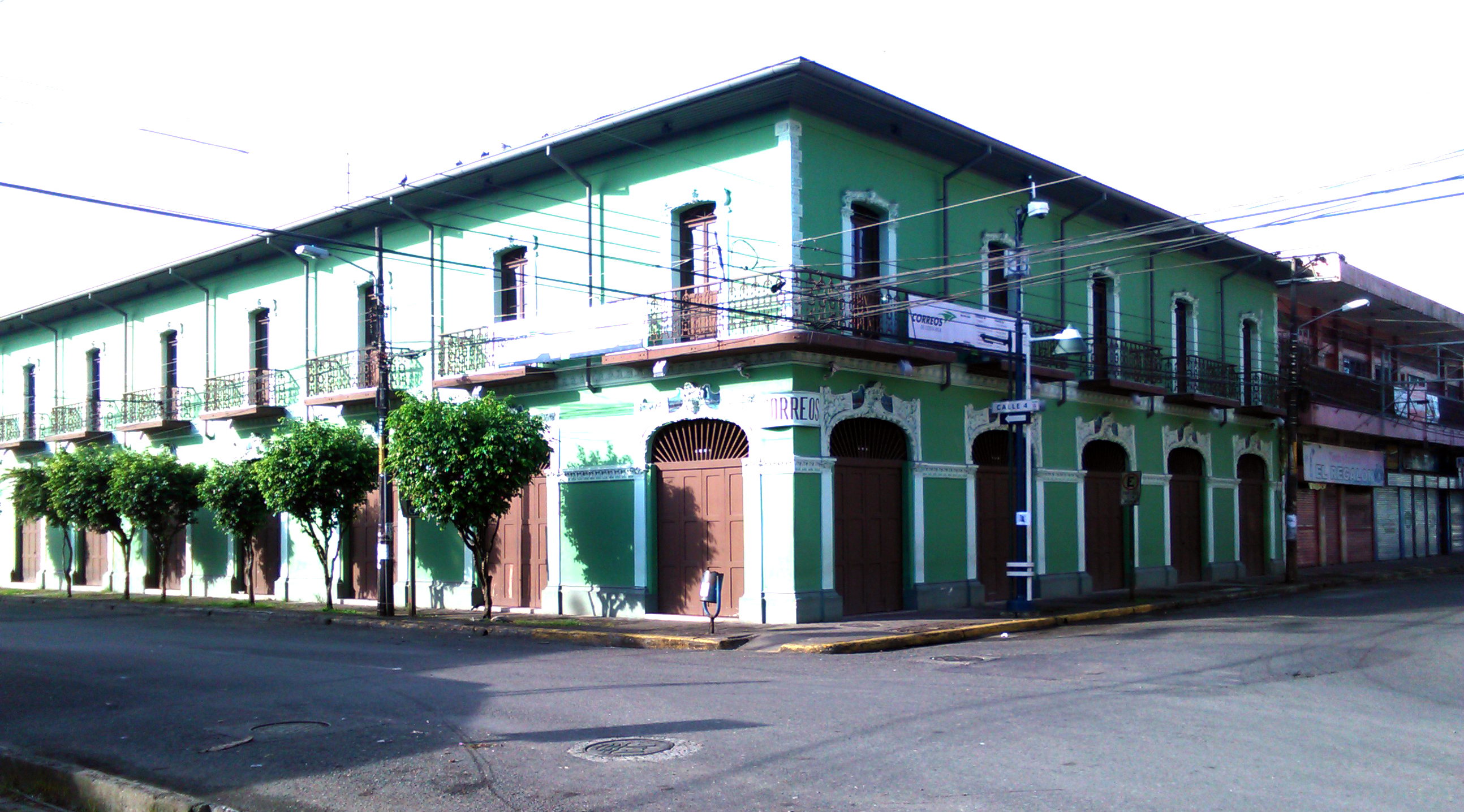
The post office building

In the past, houses in Limón followed Caribbean vernacular architecture standards, mostly tall, wooden structures, though the United Fruit Company also built Victorian-influenced houses. The post office building was originally built with such Victorian-Caribbean influences, though later redesigns added Art Nouveau ornaments to the building's façade. Furthermore, the façade of the House of Culture and City Theater has art deco influences, whereas the Costa Rica pension was built with historicist influences.

Following the 1991 Limon earthquake, and with the advent of the 21st century, the city has steadily shifted towards contemporary architecture, with examples such as the cathedral or the city hall.

=== Art ===
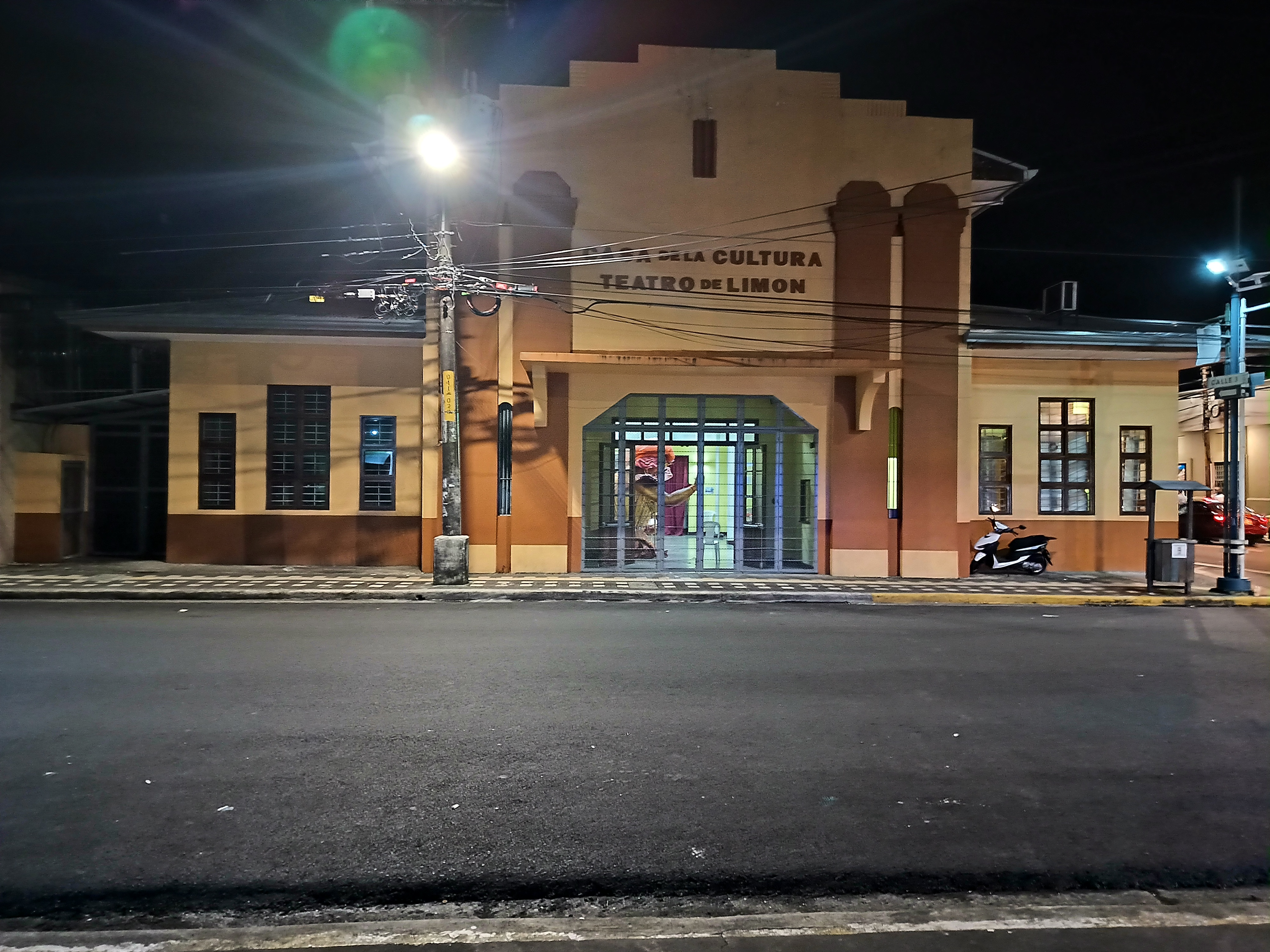
Limón's House of Culture and City Theater, one of the city's main hubs for artistic expression

A number of artists born in other parts of the country have settled in Limón and based their arts on the city and its culture. One such prominent figure is that of Ricardo "Negrín" Rodríguez, who was mostly remembered for painting in the corridor of his house in downtown Limón. Another artist is Édgar León, born in San José but raised in Limón, his early paintings depicted landscapes from the city. Other artists include Honorio Cabraca, Vicky de Solano, and Édgar "Nanny" Ramírez.

An important center for visual arts is the art gallery from the Pasaje Cristal (Crystal Passage), next to the boulevard that leads to the Balvanero Vargas park. The gallery, aside from paintings, features memorabilia from the Black Star Line building, destroyed by a fire in April 2016.

Limón's House of Culture and City Theater is also one of the most important centers for arts in the city and the province. It was restored as part of the project Limón Ciudad-Puerto (Limón City-Port), and currently hosts dance workshops, art exhibitions, and conferences. Moreover, the city has two music schools: one is located near the Tony Facio hospital, and is run by the Ministry of Culture and Youth through its National System of Musical Education, while the other is the basic music stage, run by the University of Costa Rica at the local campus.

=== Carnival ===
Puerto Limón is famous in Costa Rica for its yearly fall carnival which occurs the week of 12 October, on the eve of Columbus Day. The event was started by local community leader and activist, Alfred Josiah Henry Smith, also known as "Mister King", who helped organize the first carnival in October 1949. The event stretches about a week (across two weekends), and includes a parade, food, music, dancing, and on the last night, a concert in the Balvanero Vargas park, headlined by a major Latino or Caribbean music act. Previous artists have included Eddy Herrera (2002), Damian Marley (2003), El Gran Combo de Puerto Rico (2005), and T.O.K. (2006).

The carnival has encountered some setbacks in recent years. Organizers cancelled the 2007 carnival due to a major dengue fever outbreak, and again in 2008 due to major municipal trash-removal issues and related health worries. While trash removal had long been an issue due to lack of trucks and a 62-mile (100-kilometre) haul to the nearest landfill (in Pococí), the ordered closure of this and other landfills in 2007 meant Puerto Limón had to send trash 135 miles (217 km) to Alajuela and pay a higher disposal fee. The situation led to a bottle-neck in trash removal, which, combined with the major dengue breakout, caused organizers to cancel 2008's carnaval as a precautionary measure. Given the severity of the situation, the city bought land in nearby Santa Rosa and, in April 2009, opened its landfill (called El Tomatal). Given the improved situation, Carnaval picked up in 2009 after its two-year hiatus.

=== Cuisine ===
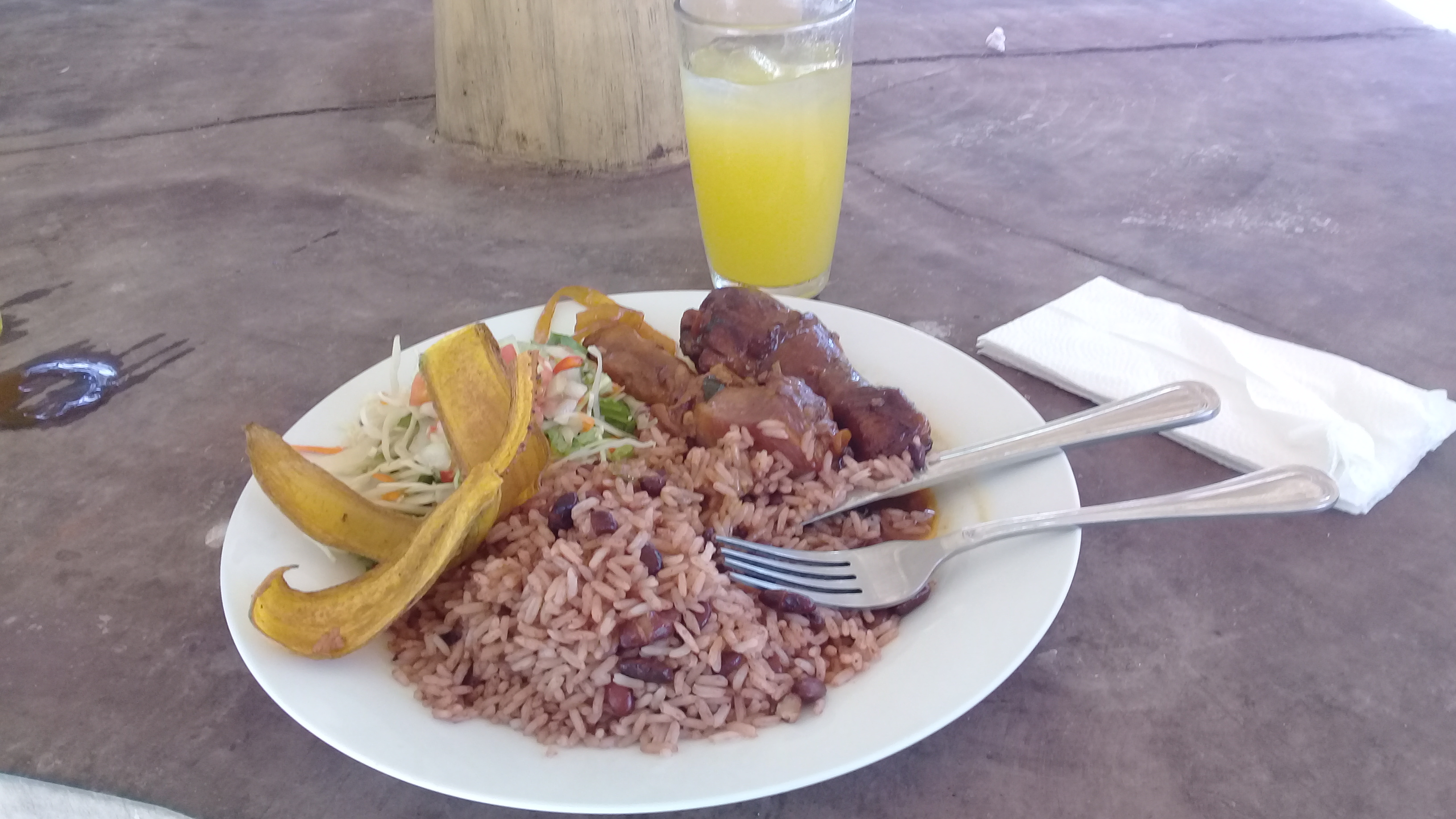
Rice and beans, a staple dish from Limón

The gastronomy of Limón diverges significantly from that of the rest of Costa Rica, and has very close ties to the Jamaican cuisine given the deep relations between the country and the Afro-Costa Ricans in the city. Likewise, other Caribbean countries also influence the Limonese cuisine.

Staple limonese dishes of Jamaican origin are rice and beans and the patty.

=== Language ===
As is the case with the entirety of the country, the main language spoken in Limón is Spanish. However, there is a large amount of the local population, predominantly those of Afro-Caribbean origins, who speak an English-based creole commonly known as Mekatelyu, considered a dialect of Jamaican Patois, given the ties between Jamaica and most Afro-Costa Rican people. With around 60,000 speakers, it is the largest minority language spoken in the country.

Recent years have seen a renewed interest in protecting and revitalizing the language. Linguist Juan Diego Quesada Pacheco pointed that the Limonese Creole has been historically neglected, as it is spoken by more people than local indigenous languages, yet it has less support by government authorities. Quesada Pacheco led a project to elaborate the grammar of many indigenous and creole languages of Central American, including Limonese Creole, an investigation for which he was awarded by the Ministry of Culture in 2017. This investigation served as the basis for translators Kheomara Cunningham and René Zúñiga to publish Di Likl Prins, a Limonese Creole-translation of The Little Prince eventually published in 2021.

In 2018, the Costa Rican government declared August 30th as the Day of Celebration of the Limonese Creole Language.

=== Literature ===
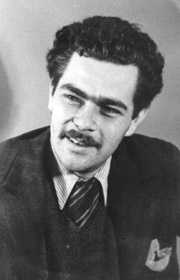
Joaquín Gutiérrez

One of the most prominent writers from Limón is Joaquín Gutiérrez, known for novellas such as Cocorí, which is taught in Costa Rican primary schools, although it has raised controversies due to its allegedly racist tone. Afro-Costa Rican politicians such as Epsy Campbell Barr and Maureen Clarke have been critical of the book and requested its exclusion from the public-education mantadory readings. Other novellas by Gutiérrez include La hoja de aire and Murámonos, Federico.

Quince Duncan is another important writer from the city. Despite being born in San José, he was raised in Estrada, Matina, near Limón. An Afro-Costa Rican, Duncan has devoted his career to the identity of Costa Ricans of African descent, and denouncing racism in the country.

Limón and its Afro-Costa Rican populace have served of inspiration for numerous writers from other parts of the country, such as Anacristina Rossi with novels such as Limón Blues and Limón Reggae, and Tatiana Lobo with Calypso. Mamita Yunai, written by Carlos Luis Fallas, is a semi-autobiographical novel which denounces the poor working conditions in the banana plantations in Limón and nearby areas under the United Fruit Company.

=== Music ===
The musicianship in the city and surrounding areas is of Caribbean origin. Calypso and mento were popular among humble neighborhoods in the early 20th century.

Musicians from Limón and surrounding areas, such as Walter Ferguson or the Marfil band, are nationally renowned.

=== Sports ===
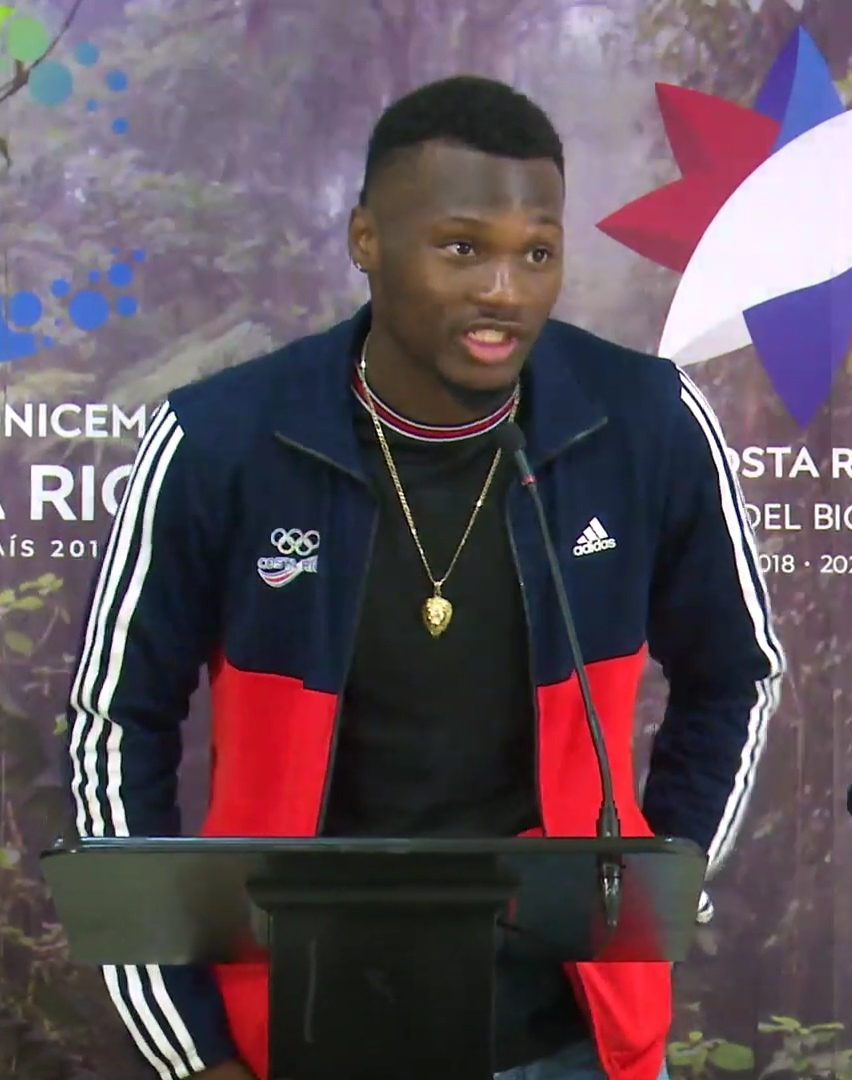
Costa Rica's first and only Paralympic medalist Sherman Guity

Described as "a hotbed for sports," Limón is nationally renowned for its strong contribution to sports, in spite of the numerous challenges faced by the population. The city has spawned numerous athletes such as Nery Brenes, Sharolyn Scott, and Sherman Guity, the latter of whom became the first Costa Rican to win a medal at the Paralympics, as he won a Silver and a Gold medal at the 2020 Summer Paralympics.

Football is also a very popular sport in the city. The city was represented by the Limon Gymnastics Society (In Spanish: Sociedad Gimnástica Limonense) at the first season of the Costa Rican Primera División, also taking part in the first match ever played. The team was eventually succeeded by further iterations, such as A.D. Limonense (also known as ASODELI), Limón FC, and the present-day Limón Black Star, all of whom have largely played at the Estadio Juan Gobán, in downtown Limón.

Limón is also the birthplace of Juan Cayasso, a historical figure for the Costa Rica national football team. On 11 June 1990, the team made its debut at a FIFA World Cup by defeating Scotland at the 1990 FIFA World Cup. Cayasso scored the lone goal, becoming the first Costa Rican to score a goal at a FIFA World Cup, which in turn gave the team its first-ever victory at the tournament. Besides Cayasso, three other Limón natives have also scored for Costa Rica at the FIFA World Cup: Winston Parks in 2002, and Keysher Fuller and Yeltsin Tejeda in 2022.

== International relations ==
=== Honorary consulates ===
Jamaica has an honorary consulate in Limón. In the past, Italy also had an honorary consulate in the city.

=== Sister city ===
- Galați, Romania (since 25 October 1992)
