= Caldera Port =

Caldera Port Puerto Caldera
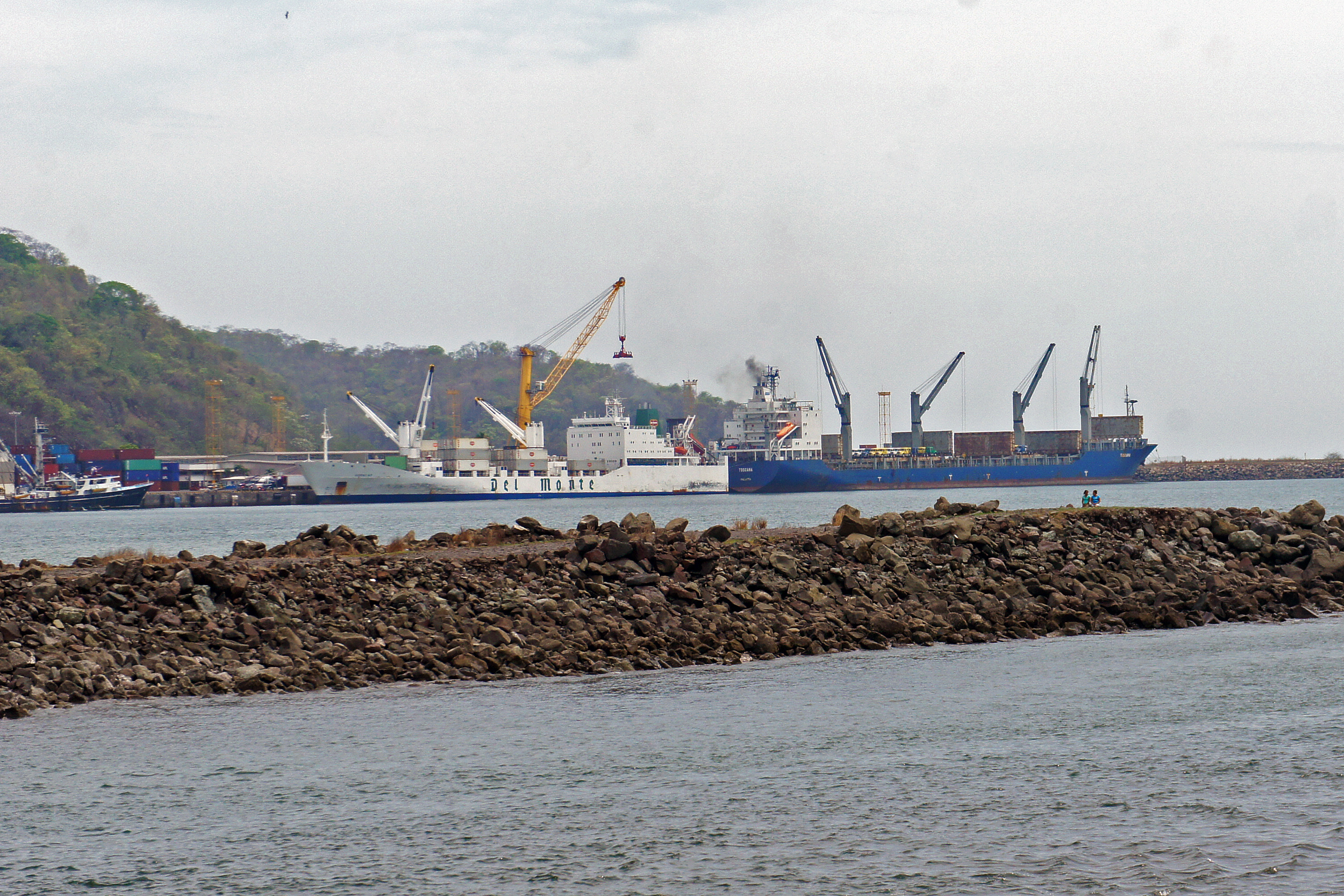
- Port of Caldera, Puntarenas, Costa Rica
- Click on the map for a fullscreen view

Location
- Country: Costa Rica
- Location: Puntarenas province
- Coordinates: 9.912703°N 84.718101°W

Details
- Opened: 17 December 1981
- Operated by: Sociedad Portuaria de Caldera and Sociedad Portuaria Granelera de Caldera
- Owned by: Public

Caldera Port (Spanish: Puerto Caldera), is the main freight port in the Pacific side of Costa Rica, located in the Esparza canton of the Puntarenas province.

== Description ==
There are two operating contiguous ports in the location, the regular container port with three docking areas, operated by Sociedad Portuaria de Caldera, and the newer grains port with only one docking area, operated by Sociedad Portuaria Granelera de Caldera and inaugurated in 2015.

== History ==
After the European colonization of the area, this was the main export and import region, using boats to transport the cargo from the shore to the ships.

A proper port was then built in the needle like peninsular area on which the Puntarenas canton and downtown city is now located, starting with wood materials in the 1910s and then steel in the 1930s. By the 1960s due to the difficulty of access to the city, it was decided to build a proper port with easier access, which started construction in the 1970s and was inaugurated on 17 December 1981.

Efforts to upgrade the port capabilities are in the planning stage, with a proposed delivery date in the year 2029 for the first stage and 2045 for the second stage, with no specific objectives per stage yet, and because the contract to manage the port only includes operations and not enhancements, it has been difficult to improve the infrastructure of the port.

== Access ==
The main access highway from the Greater Metropolitan Area is the Route 27, which due to the port is also known as Autopista San José - Caldera (San José - Caldera Highway).

== Images ==
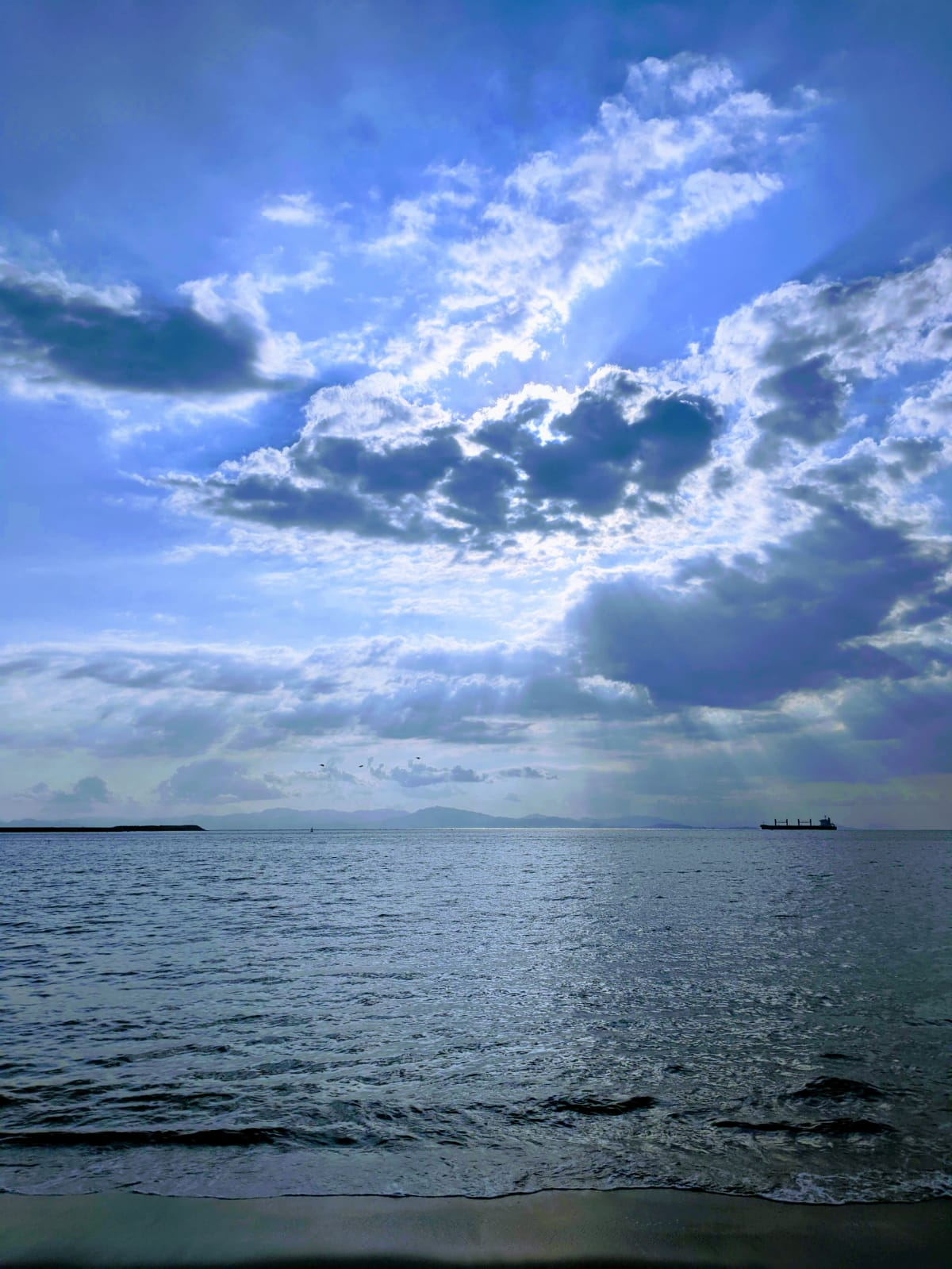
Clouds loom over as seen from Caldera port, in the Pacific coast of Costa Rica.

== See also ==
- Port of Limón, operated by JAPDEVA
- Port of Moín, operated by JAPDEVA
- Moín Container Terminal, operated by APM Terminals
