= Joaquín Gutiérrez =

Costa Rican writer and politician (1918–2000)

Don Joaquín Gutiérrez
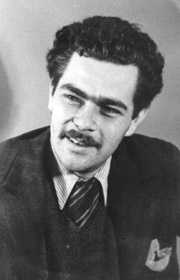
- Born: Joaquín Gutiérrez Mangel; 30 March 1918; Limón, Costa Rica
- Died: 16 October 2000 (aged 82); San José, Costa Rica
- Citizenship: Costa Rica, Chile
- Occupations: Writer, journalist
- Spouse: Elena Nascimento
- Children: 2, including Elena Gutiérrez
- Relatives: Ishtar Yasin Gutiérrez (granddaughter)
- Writing career
- Language: Spanish
- Period: 1937–1999
- Genres: Fantasy, children's, socialist realism
- Notable works: Cocorí, Puerto Limón (Port Limón), Murámonos Federico (Let's Die, Federico), La Hoja de Aire (The Sheet Made of Air)
- Notable awards: Magón National Prize for Culture, Rapa Nui Prize for Literature, José Martí World Literature Prize
- Movement: '40s Generation

Joaquín Gutiérrez Mangel (30 March 1918 – 16 October 2000) was a Costa Rican writer who won multiple awards, and whose children's book Cocorí has been translated into ten languages. In addition to writing children's books, Gutiérrez was a chess champion, war correspondent, journalist, story-teller, translator, professor, and communist activist.

== Early life ==
Born to Paul Gutiérrez and Estela Mangel Rosas in Limón on the Caribbean coast, the geographic area that inspired Cocorí, Gutiérrez moved to San José when he was nine years old and studied at Buenaventura Corrales Elementary and then the Colegio Seminario (Seminary School). While attending Liceo de Costa Rica (Costa Rica High School), Gutiérrez and five other students founded a group called the Leftist Student Wing. In 1934, he graduated from Liceo de Costa Rica. He began studying law but was expelled during a student strike. Gutiérrez's father sent him to New York to study English for a year. During his year in New York, he cultivated a friendship with Costa Rican communist Manuel Mora, one of the leaders of the Costa Rican Civil War.

In 1937, he published his first book, Poesías ("Poems"). His second book of poetry was published in 1938, titled Jicaral. In 1939, at the age of twenty-one, Gutiérrez was named Costa Rica's national chess champion and he traveled to Argentina to compete in the World Chess Championships; however, the outbreak of World War II prevented him from further competing. He worked for a time at the Central Bank of Costa Rica and joined the People's Vanguard Party, a communist party.

== Life in Chile and return to Costa Rica ==
Shortly thereafter, Gutiérrez traveled to Chile. He was attracted by the election of Pedro Aguirre Cerda, Chile's first leftist president. He returned to Costa Rica but was drawn back to Chile by a job offer from Editorial Nascimiento, one of Chile's largest publishing houses. He began working there while also contributing to Frente Popular (People's Front) and El Siglo (The Century), two leftist newspapers. In 1941, Gutiérrez was awarded the Rapa Nui Prize for Literature in Chile.

Gutiérrez's communist sympathies increased during this time. He even arranged for Soviet spy Iosif Grigulevich to obtain a falsified Costa Rican passport in 1949, under the name Teodoro B. Castro. Grigulevich would go on to represent Costa Rica diplomatically while being involved in an assassination attempt against Josip Broz Tito.

While in Chile, Gutiérrez worked as a translator for several news agencies, including Reuters, UPI, and the Associated Press. He continued his work as an editor and journalist and eventually started traveling as a correspondent. In 1962, Gutiérrez went to the Soviet Union where he reported from various regions within the communist country. He chronicled the space race and the internal political struggles between Nikita Khrushchev and Leonid Brezhnev. Gutiérrez also traveled to Vietnam to interview Ho Chi Minh in an article titled "With Uncle Ho," as well as other Vietnamese leaders.

He returned to Chile to continue working as a translator and journalist. Chilean President Salvador Allende put Gutiérrez in charge of Editora Nacional Quimantú, a publisher that focused on literature for the working class in that country. In 1972, when Augusto Pinochet deposed Allende and began a military dictatorship, Gutiérrez returned to Costa Rica.

He continued his literary career and even began teaching at the University of Costa Rica. While writing his own books and stories, he also translated and published Shakespeare's King Lear in 1981, Macbeth in 1986, Julius Caesar in 1994, as well as Hamlet. He wanted to add a Latin-American voice to the translations, as opposed to the more peninsular approach traditionally taken toward Shakespeare. Later, Gutiérrez translated the works of Mao Zedong from English to Spanish.

Gutiérrez remained politically active, even running for vice-president two times with Pueblo Unido (People's United), a leftist coalition party.

Until his last few months, Gutiérrez continued writing.

== Gutiérrez's literature ==
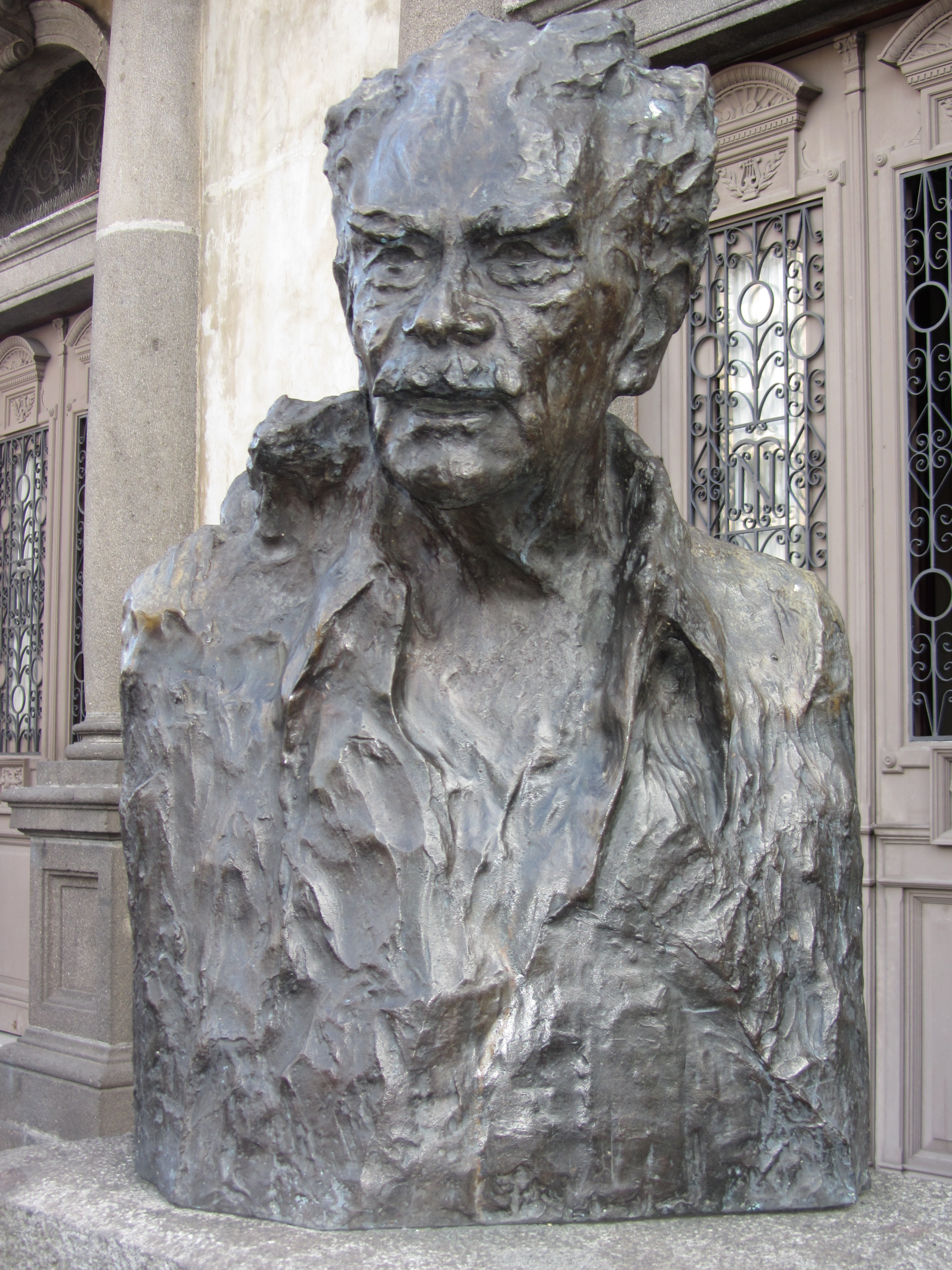
Statue of Gutiérrez outside the National Theater, San José

Along with famous Costa Rican writers Fabián Dobles, Yolanda Oreamuno, Carlos Luis Fallas, and Carmen Lyra, Gutiérrez was considered a member of "the '40s Generation." All members of the communist left, these writers espoused political ideology in their writing. Most of these writers focused on social problems, such as land distribution, multinationals, and social reforms, as did Gutiérrez. Many of the writers were active military and political participants in the Costa Rican Civil War, although Gutiérrez was in the United States and Chile at the time. He became a close friend of poet Pablo Neruda, who would write an introduction to Gutiérrez's 1968 book, La hoja de aire.

His most widely known book, Cocorí, was a short novel published in 1947. The book follows a titular character in his search for why a flower lived only one day. In 1994, the book was made required reading in Costa Rican schools. The character of Cocorí was Afro-Caribbean. The qualities he portrays in the book raised accusations of racism, notably from fellow Costa Rican author Quince Duncan, human rights activist Epsy Campbell Barr, and others working on behalf of Proyecto Caribe, an organization devoted to promoting Afro-Caribbean rights. They claimed that ugliness was associated with being of African descent and that the comparisons of the character Cocorí to monkeys create a damaging image. Guitiérrez's supporters countered that Cocorí ennobled Afro-Caribbeans. Eventually, in 2003, under the direction of Wilfrido Blanco Mora, the Ministry of Public Education dropped the requirement that Cocorí be read in public schools. For his part, when the issue of racism in Cocorí was first raised in the early 1980s, Gutiérrez said that there were no racist elements to the book. Cocorí was translated into more than 10 languages and sold more than 750,000 copies around the world.

His novel Puerto Limón, published in 1950, took place during the United Fruit strike of 1934, a common theme of the '40s Generation authors, such as Carlos Luis Fallas. It was a coming-of-age story. Murámonos Federico, published in 1974, is a story about class struggle on a Costa Rican plantation. Gutiérrez's final book was published in 1999, a memoir called Los azules días.

== Personal life ==
Gutiérrez was married to Elena Nascimento, a Chilean. Gutiérrez and Nascimento had two daughters including Elena Gutiérrez, a Chilean-Costa Rican ballet dancer, choreographer and founder of the National Dance Company of Costa Rica. Through his daughter Elena, Gutiérrez was the grandfather of Ishtar Yasin Gutiérrez, an Iraqi Chilean-Costa Rican director, screenwriter, producer and actress.

Gutiérrez died of heart failure in 2000 at 82 years old following a respiratory infection. He is buried at the Cementario General (General Cemetery) in downtown San José.

== Awards and honors ==
In Costa Rica, Gutiérrez received the Magón National Prize for Culture, was awarded a chair in the Academia Costarricense de la Lengua (Costa Rican Language Academy), and was named by the newspaper, La Nación, as the most important national literary figure of the twentieth century. He is in the Costa Rican Sports Hall of Fame for his exceptional chess career. In 1941, Gutiérrez was awarded the Rapa Nui Prize for Literature in Chile. He also received the José Martí World Literature Prize and the El Premio Casa de las Américas (Americas House Prize) in Cuba for his novel Te acordarás, hermano. The University of Costa Rica awarded him an honorary doctorate in 1992.

To honor his contributions to literature, a bust of Gutiérrez was the first statue to be placed in "El Paseo de los Artistas" (The Walk of Artists) outside the gardens of the National Theater in downtown San José. Liceo Joaquín Gutiérrez Mangel, inaugurated in 2001 in Desamparados, Costa Rica is named after Gutiérrez.

== Works ==
- Poesía, 1937, San José (Costa Rica)
- Jicaral, 1938, San José (Costa Rica)
- Cocorí, 1947, Santiago (Chile)
- Manglar, 1947, Santiago (Chile)
- Puerto Limón, novela, 1950, Santiago (Chile)
- Del Mapocho al Vístula, 1953, Santiago (Chile)
- La hoja de aire, 1968, Santiago (Chile)
- Murámonos, Federico, 1973, San José (Costa Rica)
- Volveremos, 1974
- Te conozco mascarita, 1977, Santiago (Chile)
- Te acordarás, hermano, 1978, Havana (Cuba)
- Chinto Pinto, 1982, San José (Costa Rica)
- Vietnam: Crónicas de guerra, 1988, San José (Costa Rica)
- Obras completas, 1998–2003, San José (Costa Rica)
- Crónicas de otro mundo, Editorial Universidad de Costa Rica, 1999, San José (Costa Rica)
- Los azules días, memorias, Editorial Universidad de Costa Rica, 1999, San José (Costa Rica)
