= Junta (governing body) =

Administrative institution in various periods in Spain and Latin America

Junta (/ˈhʊn.tə/ or /ˈdʒʌn.tə/) is a Spanish, Portuguese, and Italian (giunta) term for a civil deliberative or administrative council. In English, the term, even when used alone, generally refers to a "military junta", the government of an authoritarian state run by high-ranking officers of a military. The literal meaning of the word derives from juntar (to join); a group of people with a common purpose.

In Italy, a giunta is the civil executive of regions and municipalities (comune). In Spain, the term refers to various historical and current governing institutions of a particular territory or occasion. In English, the now-obsolete term "junto", derived from the Spanish "junta", was used without authoritarian connotation, first attested from 1641; the Whig Junto was a political faction in early 18th-century Britain.

== Historical examples ==
- Junta (Habsburg)
- Specific to Spain:
  - Name of some of the institutions of government of the autonomous communities of Spain (Regional Government of Andalusia and Junta of Castile and León) or the parliament of the Principality of Asturias (General Junta of the Principality of Asturias)
  - Junta (Peninsular War), 1808–1810
  - Junta acting as jury in Valladolid debate, 1550s
- Argentina:
  - Primera Junta, 1810
  - Junta Grande, 1810s
  - National Reorganization Process, 1970s
- Chile in the 1810s:
  - List of Government Juntas of Chile
- Portugal:
  - National Salvation Junta, ruled 1974−1975, after the Carnation Revolution
  - Junta de freguesia, the executive body of a freguesia (civil parish)
- Other organisations:
  - Junta de Investigación de Accidentes de Aviación Civil, the Argentinian civil aviation accident investigation agency
  - Revolutionary Government Junta, three consecutive Salvadoran joint civilian-military dictatorships
  - Junta Investigadora de Accidentes de Aviación Civil, the former Venezuelan civil aviation accident investigation agency
  - Junta de Aviación Civil, the Dominican Republic civil aviation authority
  - Junta de Administración Portuaria y de Desarrollo Económico de la Vertiente Atlántica de Costa Rica, the Costa Rican Board of Port Administration and Economic Development of the Atlantic Coast
  - Junta (trade unionism), a group of leading British trade unionists in the 1860s

== See also ==
- Coup d'état
- Military dictatorship
