= Ana Cardoso (enslaved woman) =

Costa Rican woman (c. 1650 – c. 1715)

Ana Cardoso Calvo (c.1650 - c.1715) was an enslaved mother, whose life and eventual freedom is seen to exemplify the experiences of enslaved Costa Rican women in the seventeenth and eighteenth centuries. Her descendants include former presidents, such as Oscar Arias Sanchez, as well as the writer Carlos Luis Fallas Sibaja.

== Biography ==
Born c.1650 in Cartago, Costa Rica, Cardoso's mother was an enslaved woman owned by Ana Pereira Cardoso. At around twenty years old Cardoso was purchased for 300 pesos by Spanish colonisers Tomás Calvo and his wife, Eugenia de Abarca. Their son, Miguel Calvo, began a sexual relationship with Cardoso, and over the following twenty years she had at least five children with him. Technically these children were owned by their grandmother, Eugenia.

In 1687, Eugenia sold her grandson Francisco to his father Miguel; Miguel freed him the same day. Four years later, in 1691, Eugenia sold her grand-daughters Maria (born 1682) and Feliciana (born 1685) to their father, who, again, promptly freed them. In colonial Costa Rica, children and women were more likely to be manumitted than adult men.

Cardoso was 'freed' in 1689 by Eugenia, however she was obliged to remain in service until the older woman's death. This came in 1692. Two further children were born free in 1691 and 1694. In 1715, Miguel created his will, leaving Cardoso goods from his house up to the value of 200 pesos. It also recognised his children as heirs, and bequeathed other enslaved people to them.

== Legacy ==
Cardoso's life is seen by Russell Lohse to exemplify that of enslaved women from this period. In the same way Quince Duncan and Carlos Meléndez Chaverri, refer to the change in circumstance of her life as one that was common, but often unrecorded, and a significant contributor to the development of Costa Rican society.

Many of her descendants include former Presidents of Costa Rica, such as Oscar Arias Sanchez. Another was the writer Carlos Luis Fallas Sibaja.
