= Philipp J. J. Valentini =

German-American explorer and archaeologist

- Born: 1828; Berlin, Germany
- Died: March 16, 1899 (aged 70); New York, United States
- Education: University of Berlin, University of Jena
- Occupations: explorer and archaeologist
- Writing career
- Subjects: Maya civilization, Mexican calendar stone

Philipp Johann Joseph Valentini (1828 – March 16, 1899) was an explorer and archaeologist of the Central American Pre-Columbian cultures. He worked extensively on deciphering the Mexican calendar stone.

== Life ==
Philipp J. J. Valentini was born to a German mother and Italian father in Berlin, Kingdom of Prussia, in 1828. His father was probably a tutor at the royal court of Prussia. He attended the Gymnasium of Torgau and later the University of Berlin before he left Germany for Costa Rica where he founded the seaport Puerto Limón under government auspices in 1854.

In 1858 he returned to Germany to obtain a PhD at the University of Jena, writing his dissertation about the early history of Costa Rica. From 1861 to 1871 Valentini went back once again to Costa Rica to work as a coffee planter, but travelled extensively in Central America. After 1871 he went to New York where he spent the rest of his life until his death in March 1899. Valentini was elected a member of the American Antiquarian Society in 1879. He wrote a number of scholarly articles on his archaeological work in Central America that were published in the proceedings of the society.

== Works ==
Articles in Scientific Magazines
in "Proceedings of the American Antiquarian Society":
- The Mexican Calendar Stone Proceedings of the American Antiquarian Society 8(1): 91-110. 1878

- The Katunes of the Maya History Proceedings of the American Antiquarian Society 8(4): 69-117. 1879
- The Landa Alphabet; A Spanish FabricationProceedings of the American Antiquarian Society 8(5): 59-91. 1880
- Mexican Paper Proceedings of the American Antiquarian Society 1(1): 58-81. 1880
- Two Mexican Chal chihuites Proceedings of the American Antiquarian Society 2(2): 283-302. 1881
- "The Olmecas and the Tultecas: A study in early Mexican ethnology and history" Proceedings of the American Antiquarian society 2(2): 193-230. 1883
- Analysis of the pictorial text inscribed on two Palenque Tablets Proceedings of the American Antiquarian Society 9(3): 429-450. 1894
- Analysis of the pictorial text inscribed on two Palenque Tablets PART II Proceedings of the American Antiquarian Society 10(2):399-417. 1895

Most of these were released later in book format.

Other Works
- A new, and an old Map of Yucatan in "Magazine of American History" (1879)
- "Mexican copper tools : the use of copper by the Mexicans before the conquest, and The Katunes of Maya history, a chapter in the early history of Central America, with special reference to the Pio Perez manuscript" Worcester: Press of C. Hamilton, 1880
- A Study of the Voyage of Pinzon to America (1898)

Note: Most of the texts have been translated to English by Stephen Salisbury Jr.
