= Uvita Island =

Island in Costa Rica

Native name: Quiribrí Nickname: La Huerta
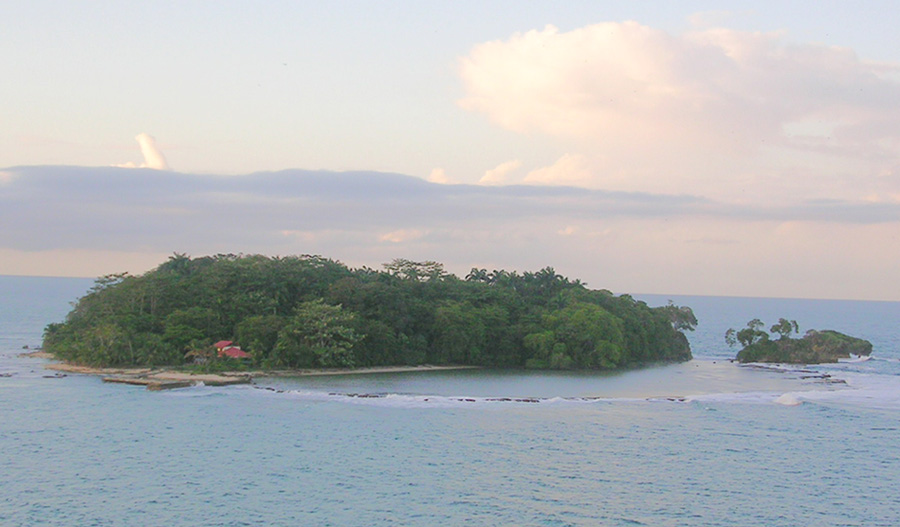
- Uvita Island

- Location within Costa Rica

Geography
- Location: Caribbean Sea
- Coordinates: 09°59′37.68″N 83°0′40.68″W
- Area: 0.8 km^{2} (0.31 sq mi)
- Length: 420 m (1380 ft)
- Width: 315 m (1033 ft)
- Highest elevation: 15 m (49 ft)

Administration
- Costa Rica

Demographics
- Population: 0

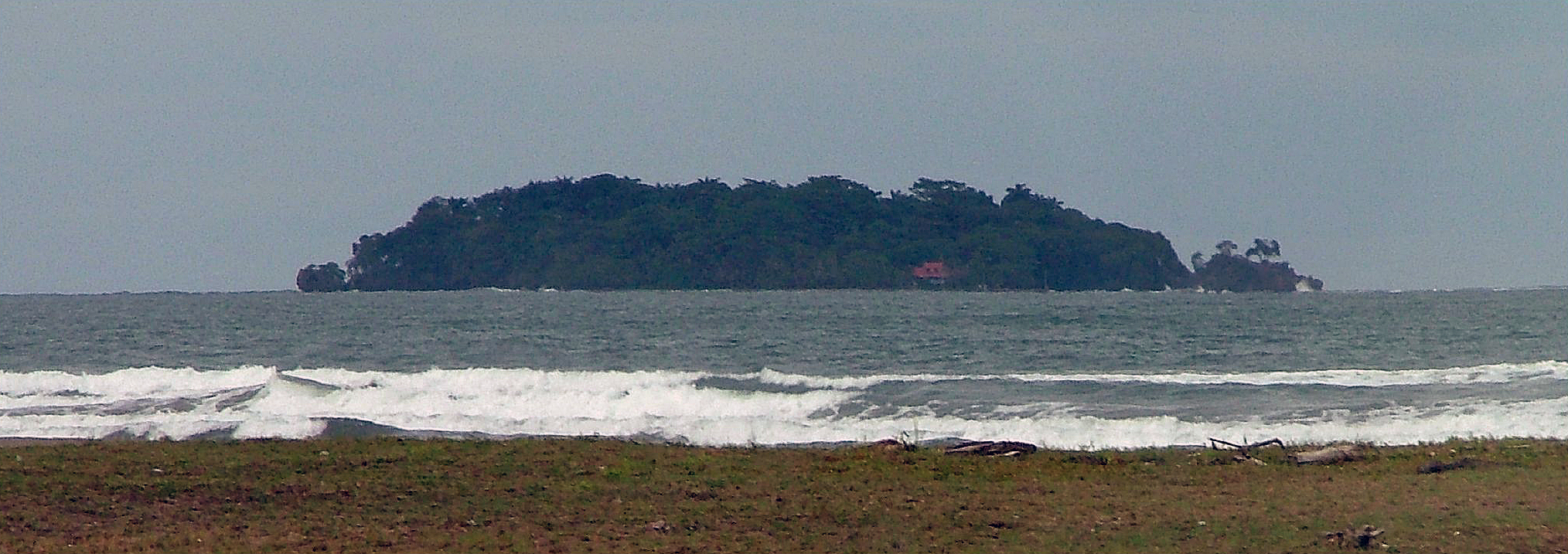
A view of Isla Uvita from the coast south of Limón

Uvita Island, or Isla Uvita (Spanish: "little grape island"), officially Isla Quiribrí, is a small 0.8-square-kilometre (0.3-square-mile) island 885 metres (2,904 feet) offshore of the port at Limón on the Caribbean coast of Costa Rica. The island is 420 metres (1,380 feet) long from north to south and 315 metres (1,033 feet) across at its widest, northwest to southeast. It is currently uninhabited, but there is at least one structure on the island, and a small dock. It is possible to visit the island by renting a boat and a driver at one of the fishing docks on the Cieneguita River.

== Island name ==
Uvita has had several names over the years; in English, these include Grape Cay, Grape Island, and Uvia Island; in Spanish, the names Isla Uvita and La Uvita are now most common. The Cariari Indians called the island Quiribrí. In 1986 the Comisión Nacional de Nomenclatura (National Commission of Nomenclature) approved the restoration of the name Isla Quiribrí, and the Academia de Geografía e Historia de Costa Rica (Academy of Geography and History of Costa Rica) asked that the Comisión and the Municipality of Limón publish the name change in 2002 during the 500th anniversary of the arrival of Christopher Columbus on the island. Isla Quiribrí is now the official name but is seldom used; locally, the island is still referred to as Isla Uvita, even on official government maps.

== History ==
Christopher Columbus anchored his ships on the island for repairs during his final voyage to America in 1502, and gave the island the name of La Huerta (Spanish: "the orchard"). The two-week visit allowed contact with the Indigenous people, who welcomed the Europeans dressed in clothing of gold, which was the reason that some mistakenly attributed to Columbus the naming of Costa Rica (Spanish: "rich coast"), a name which was actually first used by the Royal Audiencia of Panama in 1538.
