= Editora Nacional Quimantú =

Chilean publishing company, 1971 to 1973

- Status: Defunct (September 11, 1973)
- Founded: 1971
- Founder: Government of Chile
- Successor: Editorial Quimantú (2000 )
- Country of origin: Chile
- Distribution: National
- Key people: Joaquín Gutiérrez - General Manager
- Publication types: Books and magazines
- Nonfiction topics: National Culture, History, Politics, Magazines for children, teens and women

Editora Nacional Quimantú was a Chilean publishing house created in 1971 by Salvador Allende's Unidad Popular government. It was founded under the premise of offering various literary works and a view of Chilean culture not covered by the "official bourgeois tradition" by then, at an accessible price for the country's working class. Quimantú is mapuche for "sun of knowledge".

Now refounded as Editorial Quimantú, it is in charge of "a group of people that decided that dreams aren't of much use if we don't try to make them a reality, belonging to social, cultural and political organizations in various sectors of Santiago de Chile."

== History ==
=== Foundation ===
Towards the end of 1970, the workers of Editorial Zig-Zag went on strike in order to push for the nationalization of their publishing house. On February 12, 1971, the Unidad Popular government took control of 40% of the company's assets, leading to the creation of the Empresa Editora Nacional Quimantú (National Quimantú Publishing Company, Ltd.). It was run by Joaquín Gutiérrez, a Costa Rican close to President Allende.

The books published by Quimantú were sold at very low prices in bookshops and newspaper kiosks, in order to effectively make culture more accessible to the people. Its catalogue included classical and contemporary works of literature, history, general information and original research. It also set up weekly and monthly magazines, including Cabrochico for children, Onda for young people, Barrabases, a comics magazine, Paloma for women and La Quinta Rueda, a cultural publication.

Joaquín Gutiérrez once commented, on the influence of Quimantú:

The people were walking around with their little books in order to read them on buses. The care for culture that the workers developed over that time was beautiful. (...) We had managed to change the social connotations of having books, which until then had been the privilege of a cultural elite.

=== Closure and refoundation ===
In 1973, Editorial Nacional Quimantú was closed after the 1973 Chilean coup d'état and subsequent dictatorial regime (supported by the United States) led by General Augusto Pinochet, and many of its books were burned. The following year, the military restarted a publishing house, named Editora Nacional Gabriela Mistral, but it went bankrupt ten years later and closed.

In 1989, former general manager of the editorial Sergio Maurín came back from exile by the military regime and registered the name for ten years with the intention of "constituting it as an anonymous society and making it big" with other former members. The plan was abandoned upon realizing the high initial costs this implied, and its poor profitability due to the poor presence and management of bookstores and the public's lack of interest in reading.

A decade later, the idea of making an alternative, popular editorial emerged in an "extraparliamentary left-wing collective", and thus the name Quimantú was registered again in 2000, and its first title, "Agenda del Che 2002", published in November 2001. The refounded company is currently managed by Mario Ramos, and books are distributed independently from traditional bookstores - as this would increase end consumer costs considerably - preferring popular fairs, including their own "Yo me libro".

== Collections ==
Editora Nacional Quimantú published a total of around 250 titles, of which it printed around 10 million copies, between November 1971 and August 1973. One year after its foundation, it published over 500 000 copies every month. Its collections included:

- Quimantú para todos (Quimantú for all)
- Minilibros (Minibooks: works of Chilean and world literature)
- Nosotros los chilenos (We, the Chileans)
- Cuadernos de Educación Popular (Books for Popular Education)
- Cuncuna (children's books)
- Camino Abierto (Open Path)
- Análisis, pensamiento y acción (Analysis, Thought, Action)
- Clásicos del Pensamiento Social (Classics of Social Thought)
- Figuras de América (Figures of America)
