= Ishtar Yasin Gutiérrez =

Film director, screenwriter and actress (born 1968)

- عشتار ياسين جوتيريز
- Born: 1968 (age 57–58); Moscow, Soviet Union
- Education: Gerasimov Institute of Cinematography, 1990
- Occupations: Director; screenwriter; producer; actress
- Mother: Elena Gutiérrez
- Relatives: Joaquín Gutiérrez (grandfather)
- Website: ishtaryasin.com

Ishtar Yasin Gutiérrez (Arabic: عشتار ياسين جوتيريز; born 1968) is a Soviet-born Iraqi Chilean-Costa Rican director, screenwriter, producer and actress based in Mexico. In 2008, Yasin made her directorial debut with the feature film The Path (Spanish: El Camino).

== Biography ==
Yasin was born in 1968 in Moscow, Soviet Union (present-day Russia) to Mohsen Sadoon Yasin, an Iraqi theater director, and Elena Gutiérrez, a Chilean-Costa Rican ballet dancer, choreographer and founder of the National Dance Company of Costa Rica. Through her mother, Yasin was the granddaughter of the Costa Rican writer Joaquín Gutiérrez.

In 1968, the family settled in Chile but fled to Costa Rica following the 1973 coup d'état. From 1979 to 1984, Yasin studied at the Conservatorio de Castella. In 1985, aged 17, Yasin returned to Soviet Union and studied at the Gerasimov Institute of Cinematography. Yasin graduated with a Masters in 1990.

In Costa Rica, Gutiérrez founded the Ámbar Theatre in 1992 and the Astarté Films production company in 1999. In 2004, Gutiérrez had a residency at the Centre d'Écriture Cinématographique in Normandy. Yasin made her directorial debut with the feature film The Path (Spanish: El Camino) in 2008. In 2012, Gutiérrez settled in Mexico.

== Filmography ==
Year	Title	Type	Director	Writer	Actor	Producer	Editor	Notes	Ref(s)
1989	Full Moon (Russian: Полнолуние)	Feature	No	No	Yes	No	No	Directed by Naana Chankova	
2000	Florence of the deep rivers and the big sharks (Spanish: Florencia de los ríos hondos y los tiburones grandes)	Short	Yes	Yes	Yes	Yes	Yes		
2005	The happy table (Spanish: La mesa feliz)	Short documentary	Yes	Yes				Dedicated to Antonio Cuevas	
2007	The Path (Spanish: El Camino)	Feature	Yes	Yes	No	Yes	No		
2009	What's going on?	Feature	No	No	Yes	No	No	Directed by Jocelyne Saab	
2010	The Invisibles (Spanish: Les Invisibles	Documentary	Yes	Yes					
2014	Apocalypse of our Time (Spanish: Apocalipsis de nuestro tiempo)	Documentary	Yes		No	Yes	No		
2018	Two Fridas (Spanish: Dos Fridas)	Feature	Yes	Yes	Yes	Yes	No		
2022	My Lost Country	Documentary	Yes	Yes	Self	Yes	Yes		
