= Elena Gutiérrez =

Costa Rican-Chilean ballet dancer and choreographer (born 1944)

- Born: Elena Gutiérrez Nascimento; 1944 (age 81–82)
- Education: School of Dance, University of Chile; Beijing Dance School; Lunacharsky State Institute for Theatre Arts
- Spouse: Mohsen Sadoon Yasin (divorced)
- Children: Ishtar Yasin Gutiérrez
- Father: Joaquín Gutiérrez
- Dancing career
- Former groups: Chilean National Ballet, 1968–1973

Elena Gutiérrez Nascimento (born 1944) is a Costa Rican-Chilean ballet dancer, choreographer and founder of Costa Rica's National Dance Company (Spanish: Compania Nacional de Danza). Gutiérrez was the founder and the first director of the School of Dance at the National University of Costa Rica.

== Early life and education ==
Gutiérrez was born in 1944 to Joaquín Gutiérrez, a Costa Rican writer, and Elena Nascimento, a Chilean.

Enrolling at the School of Dance at the University of Chile in 1958, Gutiérrez studied under Joan Jara, Sigurd Leeder and Patricio Bunster. Gutiérrez later studied at the Beijing Dance School and the Bolshoi Theatre before earning a MA from the Choreography Faculty of the Lunacharsky State Institute for Theatre Arts.

== Career ==
In 1968, Gutiérrez settled in Chile and began dancing for the Chilean National Ballet. Following the 1973 Chilean coup d'état, Gutiérrez and her family fled to Costa Rica.

In 1974, Gutiérrez founded and became the first director of the School of Dance at the National University of Costa Rica. The following year, Gutiérrez and Cristina Gigirey founded the Ballet Moderno de Cámara. Later institutionalized by the Ministry of Culture, the Ballet Moderno de Cámara became the National Dance Company (Spanish: Compania Nacional de Danza) in 1979.

Gutiérrez choreographed Beatles 3/4 (1976), Pavana Para una Infanta (1980), Brindis (1985) and Bienaventurados (1987).

== Personal life ==
Gutiérrez was previously married to Mohsen Sadoon Yasin (1932–2014), an Iraq theatre director, before later divorcing. Gutiérrez gave birth to the couple's daughter Ishtar Yasin Gutiérrez, a director, screenwriter, producer and actress, whilst studying in Moscow.
