= Quince Duncan =

Writer

Quince Duncan (born 1940 in San José, Costa Rica), is regarded as Costa Rica's first Afro-Caribbean writer in the Spanish language. His works typically concern the Afro-Caribbean population living on Costa Rica's Caribbean coast, particularly around the city of Puerto Limón. His novels and short stories have been awarded Costa Rica's National Literature Prize (Premio Nacional de Literatura) and Premio Editorial Costa Rica. He has also published a novel in English, A Message from Rosa. With Carlos Meléndez Chaverri he wrote that the life of enslaved woman Ana Cardoso was one that was common, but often unrecorded, and a significant contributor to the development of Costa Rican society.

== Personal life ==
He has three sons from his first marriage, Andrés, Jaime and Pablo, to whom he dedicated his book Los Cuentos del Hermano Araña. He also has two daughters from his second marriage, Shara and Denise.

== Bibliography ==
- "Una canción en la madrugada" (short story, 1970)
- Hombres curtidos (novel, 1971)
- "El negro en Costa Rica" (with Carlos Meléndez) (essay, 1972)
- Los cuatro espejos (novel, 1973)
- "La rebelión pocomía, y otros relatos" (short story, 1974)
- Los cuentos del Hermano Araña (children's stories, 1975)
- "El negro en la literatura costarricense" (essay, 1975)
- Los cuentos de Jack Mantorra (children's stories, 1977)
- La paz del pueblo (novel, 1978)
- Final de calle (novel, 1980)
- "Teoría y práctica del racismo" (with Lorein Powell) (essay, 1984)
- Kimbo (novel, 1990)
- Un señor de chocolate (anecdotes, 1997)
- "Contra el silencio" (essay, 2001)
- A Message from Rosa (novel, 2004)
