= Port of Moín =

Port in Costa Rica

Gastón Kogan Kogan Terminal Terminal Gastón Kogan Kogan Port of Moín
- Click on the map for a fullscreen view

Location
- Country: Costa Rica
- Location: Limón province
- Coordinates: 10.003312°N 83.077013°W

Details
- Operated by: JAPDEVA
- Owned by: Public

The Port Terminal of Moín, (Spanish: Terminal Portuaria de Moín), whose official name is Gastón Kogan Kogan Terminal, is located in the Moín bay, west to the city of Limón, is one of the seaports in the Caribbean coast of Costa Rica. Not to be confused with the Moín Container Terminal operated by APM Terminals.

== See also ==
- Port of Limón, operated by JAPDEVA.
- Moín Container Terminal, operated by APM Terminals.
