= Cocorí =

1947 children's novel by Joaquín Gutiérrez

First edition (publ. Editorial Rapa Nui)

Cocorí is Costa Rican author Joaquín Gutiérrez's most popular children's book, perhaps only topped by La Hoja de Aire. Published in 1947, the short novel ranks among the most outstanding children's stories in Costa Rica, though it is no longer mandatory but suggested reading in primary schools. It has been translated into ten languages, and adapted for the theater several times in Germany, Czech Republic, Mexico and seven other countries.

== Plot ==
The story concerns a small black child from the Caribbean coast of Costa Rica, who meets a blonde tourist girl who gives him a rose. In return, she asks for a squirrel monkey. Smitten, he fulfills his promise by setting a trap made out of rice and a coconut, but when he returns to where he had seen her, the boat she had come in was gone. When he returns, to his home, he finds that the rose she had given him had wilted. He asks his mother, Drusila, why it had lived such a short time while other things last much, much longer. She doesn't know, so he ran around his village, asking the neighbors the same question. None of them know, so he asks his friend, Doña Madorra the turtle, his question. She doesn't know, so she brings him and the squirrel monkey around the jungle, asking some old and wise animals including Don Torcuato the alligator and Talamanca the bocaracá, a snake. After the interrogations of the alligator and the snake, Cocorí finally gets an answer from El Negro Cantor. He returns home to find that Drusila had planted the stem of the wilted rose and so grown a rose bush.

== Controversy ==
When the book was made mandatory reading, the Proyecto Caribe Association, in charge of defending the culture of the Caribbean coast of Costa Rica, populated almost exclusively by African descendants, protested. They argued the book was "racist" and "offensive" to the local culture, and as such, should not be read in schools. "We ask the Ministry of Education, should they not want to eliminate the book from the program, to at least include works by afrodescendant authors that can show the values of our culture." These claims were dismissed, and the book continues to be read in schools nationwide.

In spite of this, recent government guidelines have excluded it at least from the grade school curriculum.
