= Port of Limón =

Hernán Garrón Salazar Terminal Terminal Hernán Garrón Salazar Port of Limón
- Click on the map for a fullscreen view

Location
- Country: Costa Rica
- Location: Limón province
- Coordinates: 9.990679°N 83.022017°W

Details
- Opened: 1852
- Operated by: JAPDEVA
- Owned by: Public

The Port Terminal of Limón, (Spanish: Terminal Portuaria de Limón), whose official name is Hernán Garrón Salazar Terminal, adjacent to the city of Limón, is one of the seaports in the Caribbean coast of Costa Rica.

The port was officially established in 1852, during the government of Juan Rafael Mora Porras. Still, it was not linked to the capital, San José, or the rest of the country until the 1890s, when the construction of the railroad to the Atlantic was finished by the United States businessman Minor C. Keith.

== See also ==
- Port of Moín, operated by JAPDEVA
- Moín Container Terminal, operated by APM Terminals
