= Carlos Luis Fallas =

Costa Rican author and political activist

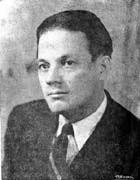
Carlos Luis Fallas

Carlos Luis Fallas Sibaja (January 21, 1909 – May 7, 1966), also known as Calufa (from the initial syllables of his first, middle and last name), was a Costa Rican author and communist political activist.

Born in Alajuela to a single mother, Fallas completed only the first two years of secondary schooling before moving to Limón, on the Atlantic coast, where he worked in the banana plantations of the United Fruit Company. Finding conditions there intolerable, he returned to Alajuela at the age of 22 and found work as a shoemaker.

Fallas became active in the organized labor movement and in the Communist Party of Costa Rica. After a bloody clash between striking workers and the police, a judge sentenced him in 1933 one year of banishment in the Atlantic coast. There, Fallas became the leader of the 15,000-strong banana workers' strike of 1934. In 1942, Fallas was elected city council representative and in 1944 he became a national congressman. He fought in the Costa Rican Civil War of 1948 on the side of the government forces, to which the communists were then allied.

As an author he is best known for his novels Mamita Yunai (1940), which denounced the harsh condition endured by workers for the United Fruit Company and which is referenced in Pablo Neruda's Canto General, and for Marcos Ramírez (1952), a humorous bildungsroman about the life of a Costa Rican boy in the early 20th century, taken largely from Fallas's own life. Other works include Gentes y gentecillas (1947), and Mi madrina (1954).

Despite his brief formal schooling and relatively meager output, Fallas is one of the most widely read Costa Rican authors. In 1962 he was awarded the William Faulkner Foundation's Ibero-American Novel Prize for Marcos Ramírez. He received the Magón Prize, Costa Rica's highest recognition for cultural work, shortly before his death from kidney cancer at the age of 57. The Costa Rican Congress posthumously declared him Benemérito de la Patria ("Deserving Citizen," the highest distinction that the government can extend) in 1977.

Fallas is a descendant of Ana Cardosa, an enslaved woman from Cartago.

== Works ==
- "Barreteros y otros cuentos" 1987 ISBN 978-9977230634
- "Mamita Yunai" Novel,1941. ISBN 978-9977239279
- "Marcos Ramírez" Novel, 1952. ISBN 978-9977232911
- "Mi madrina" Novel, 1954.
- "Gentes y gentecillas" Novel, 1947.
- "Cuenta Braña: un mecánico comunista en la Europa nazi" ISBN 978-9977653334
