= Moín Container Terminal =

Moín Container Terminal Terminal de Contenedores de Moín
- Click on the map for a fullscreen view

Location
- Country: Costa Rica
- Location: Limón province
- Coordinates: 10.013017°N 83.097563°W

Details
- Opened: February 2019
- Operated by: APM Terminals
- Owned by: Public concession

The Moín Container Terminal, officially known in Spanish as Terminal de Contenedores de Moín is a container port in the Limón province of Costa Rica. Not to be confused with the Port of Moín, operated by JAPDEVA.

== History ==
Its construction started in early 2015, and is currently operated by concession of the government by the APM Terminals company. It is the first artificial island created in the country

The first vessel to arrive was CAP BEATRICE on 27 October 2018, before its inauguration in February 2019.

Route 257 is a road that was built and designated a national route, to connect Route 32 to the port.

== See also ==
- Port of Limón, operated by JAPDEVA
- Port of Moín, operated by JAPDEVA
