= National Route 257 (Costa Rica) =

National Road Route in Costa Rica

National Secondary Route 257
- Ruta nacional secundaria 257

Route information
- Maintained by Ministry of Public Works and Transport
- Length: 2.3 km (1.4 mi)
- Existed: 26 January 2018–present

Major junctions
- West end: Route 32
- East end: Moín Container Terminal

Location
- Country: Costa Rica
- Provinces: Limón

Highway system
- National Road Network of Costa Rica
| ← Route 256 | → Route 301 |

National Secondary Route 257 is an arterial road from Route 32 to the Moín Container Terminal in the Caribbean sea of Costa Rica.

== Description ==
This is a 2.3 km two lane road, one in each direction, that was created for the cargo transportation between Route 32 and Moín Container Terminal.

== History ==
At the time of its construction, it was heavily criticized due to a critical geographic gaffe, as there was a problem of communication between the actors involved, with an 80m error in the design plans, and a whole new redesign was required for a much more expensive road than projected, at about an additional CRC ₡7,900 million, including an elevated highway with a length of 817m.

The country comptroller was involved in the investigation of the gaffe.

The road was opened for general use on 26 January 2018, it took eighteen months to complete.
