= Carlos Meléndez Chaverri =

Costa Rican historian

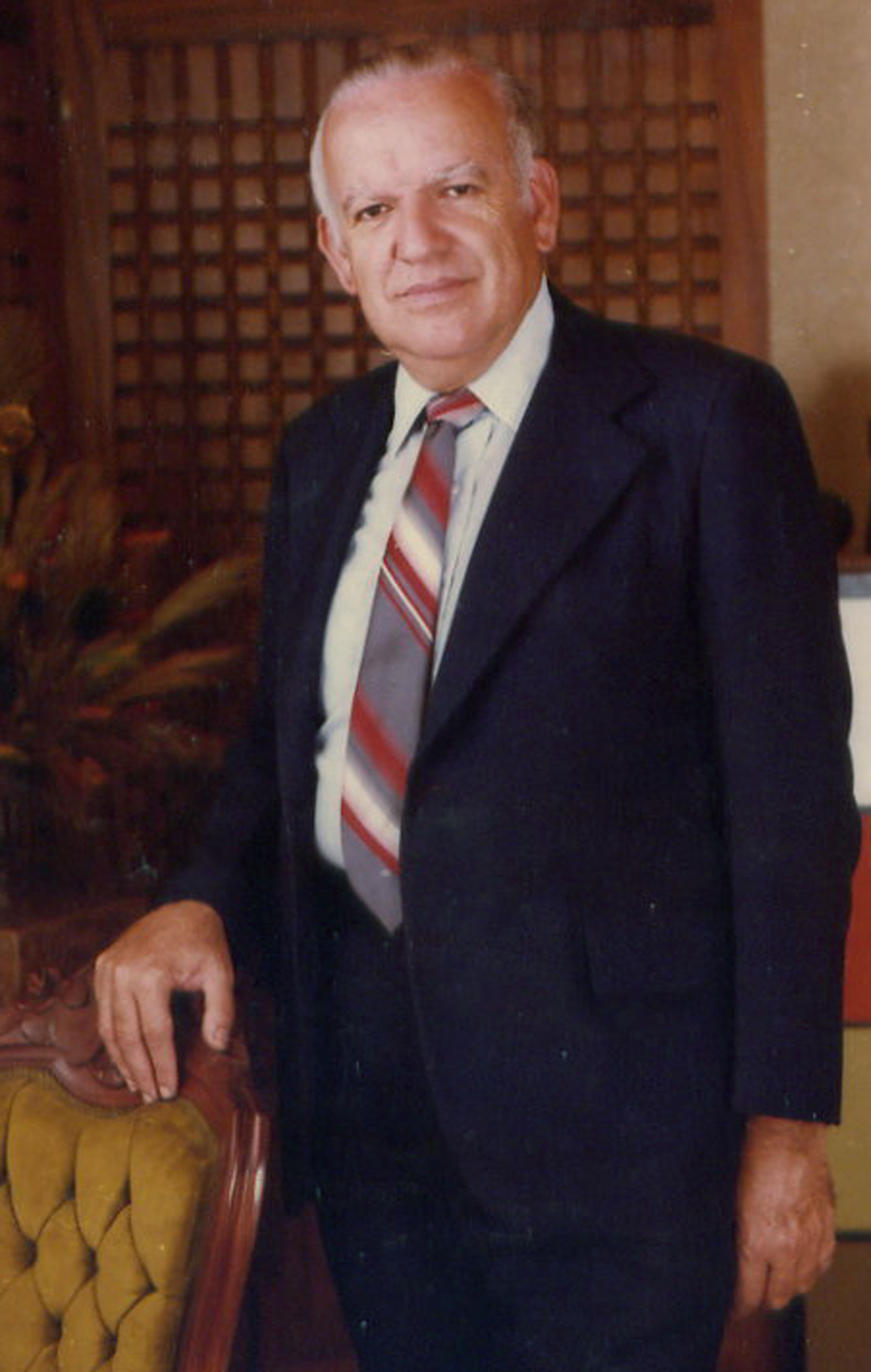
- Born: 23 June 1926; Heredia, Costa Rica
- Died: 12 June 2000 (aged 73)
- Occupation: Historian
- Spouse: María Lourdes Doubles Umaña
- Children: 5

Carlos Meléndez Chaverri (June 23rd, 1926 – June 12th, 2000) was a Costa Rican historian. Meléndez was the son of Saturnino Lizano and Chaverri Orfilia Chacon. He married María Lourdes Doubles Umaña, with whom he had five children: Silvia María, Lucia, Diego, Alberto and Pablo Meléndez Doubles. He won the Magón National Prize for Culture in 1993.

== Education ==
He began his primary studies at Escuela República Argentina, and continued them at the Central School of Puntarenas. Due to work, Don Saturnino, his father, moved with his family to Limón, where Carlos finished his primary education at the School of Tomás Guardia. After a year in Limon, the family moved to Heredia, where he attended Escuela Normal de Costa Rica and was a student of renowned professors such as Fernando Vargas Fernández, Uladislaus Gámez Solano "Don Lalo", and Marco Tulio Salazar Salazar. On December 13th of 1946, Carlos Meléndez finished his secondary education. He later earned a BA in Literature and Philosophy with a major in History and Geography in 1952 at the University of Costa Rica [1].

== Work ==
His first job was at Escuela Normal (later, Liceo de Heredia) between the years 1948 to 1953. He was a founder and principal of Liceo Nocturno Alfredo González F. at Heredia, a job he held from 1953 to 1960. In those same years he was Head of the Section of Anthropology and History at the National Museum of Costa Rica. In 1958 he joined as a part time teacher at the University of Costa Rica and later became full time in 1960. He was Director of the Department of History and Geography (now School of the Faculty of Social Sciences) at University of Costa Rica between 1960 and 1969. His highest title was "full professor" (the most senior academic position).

In 1965 he conducted historical research in Guatemala City with a subsidy from OAS. In 1973 he lived in Spain with a scholarship, where he researched at General Archive of the Indies in Sevilla, National Historical Archive (Spain) in Madrid, and at Royal Academy of History also in Madrid

He worked at University of Costa Rica until 1986 when he retired. He was Ambassador to Costa Rica in Spain from 1985 to 1986.

== Death ==
He died on the 12th of June of 2000 at 10:45am at his home in Heredia from a complication after a brain surgery, from which he did not recover. His body was veiled at Casa de la Cultura in Heredia and his funerary was done the next day at Iglesia Inmaculada Concepción (La Parroquia) in Heredia. His remains lay with his family's grave at the Heredian Cemetery. The University of Costa Rica made an homage after his death.
