= Junta de Administración Portuaria y de Desarrollo Económico de la Vertiente Atlántica de Costa Rica =

Economic development entity in Costa Rica

The Junta de Administración Portuaria y de Desarrollo Económico de la Vertiente Atlántica de Costa Rica (JAPDEVA) is the Board of Port Administration and Economic Development of the Atlantic Coast of Costa Rica. It was established in 1963 as an autonomous entity of the State in order to ensure the maintenance of the canals of the northern province of Limon (Tortuguero and Barra del Colorado) and monitor government contracts with regard to ports and railways.
