= Julieta (name) =

Julieta is a predominantly Spanish, Catalan and Portuguese variant of the given name Julia or Júlia. Notable people with this name include:

- Julieta Amaral (1962–2024), Brazilian journalist
- Julieta Aranda (born 1975), Mexican artist
- Julieta Campos (1932–2007), Cuban-Mexican writer
- Julieta Campusano (1918–1991), Chilean politician
- Julieta Cantaluppi (born 1985), Italian rhythmic gymnast
- Julieta Cardinali (born 1977), Argentine actress
- Julieta Castellán (born 1972), Argentine field hockey player
- Julieta Castellanos (born 1954), Honduran sociologist
- Julieta Cazzuchelli (born 1993), Argentine musician known as Cazzu
- Julieta Cruz (born 1996), Argentine footballer
- Julieta Díaz (born 1977), Argentine model and actress
- Julieta Dobles (born 1943), Costa Rican poet and writer
- Julieta Egurrola (born 1953), Mexican actress
- Julieta Fierro (1948–2025), Mexican astrophysicist and science communicator
- Julieta Franco (born 1977), Argentine field hockey player
- Julieta Gandra (1917–2007), Portuguese doctor
- Julieta Susana Gonzalo (born 1981), Argentine actress known as Julie Gonzalo
- Julieta Grajales (born 1986), Mexican actress
- Julieta Granada (born 1986), Paraguayan golfer
- Julieta Jankunas (born 1999), Argentine field hockey player
- Julieta Kirkwood (1936–1985), Chilean academic and feminist activist
- Julieta Lanteri (1873–1932), Argentine pharmacologist and suffragist
- Julieta Lazcano (born 1989), Argentine volleyball player
- Julieta Lema (born 2000), Argentine footballer
- Julieta Marín Torres (1944–2015), Mexican politician
- Julieta Mabel Monje, Bolivian politician
- Julieta Ortega (born 1972), Argentine actress
- Julieta Paredes (born c. 1967), Bolivian feminist activist
- Julieta Pareja (born 2009), American tennis player
- Julieta Pinto (1921–2022), Costa Rican writer
- Julieta Poggio (born 2002), Argentine model
- Julieta Rada (born 1990), Argentine musician
- Julieta Ramírez (disambiguation), multiple people
- Julieta Rosen (born 1962), Mexican actress
- Julieta Sáenz (born 1954), Mexican gymnast
- Julieta Schildknecht (born 1960), Swiss photographer
- Julieta Sciancalepore (born 1987), Argentine dancer
- Julieta Serrano (born 1933), Spanish actress
- Julieta Szönyi (1949–2025), Romanian actress
- Julieta Toledo (born 1997), Mexican fencer
- Julieta Valero (born 1971), Spanish poet
- Julieta Valls Noyes (born 1962), American diplomat
- Julieta Venegas (born 1970), American-born Mexican singer
- Julieta Zylberberg (born 1983), Argentine actress
