= Aquileo J. Echeverría National Prize =

The Aquileo J. Echeverría National Prize (Spanish: Premio Nacional Aquileo J. Echeverría) is the highest honor in Costa Rica for creative work. First given in 1962, it has been awarded in the categories of poetry, short stories, novels, essays, theater, history, miscellaneous books, visual arts, and music. The prize is awarded by the government of Costa Rica through the Ministry of Culture and Youth, and it is coordinated by the ministry's Colegio de Costa Rica.

As of 2015, the prize was restructured under Law No. 9211, "Law About National Cultural Prizes," to solely include the categories of novels, short stories, poetry, essays, and drama.

The prize is named in homage to the Costa Rican poet Aquileo J. Echeverría.

== Winners ==
=== Novel ===
Winners of the Aquileo J. Echeverría National Prize: Novel
| 1962 | None | |
| 1963 | None | |
| 1964 | Hernán Elizondo Arce | Memorias de un pobre diablo |
| 1965 | None | |
| 1966 | Carmen Naranjo Coto | Los perros no ladraron |
| 1967 | Fabián Dobles Rodríguez | En el San Juan hay tiburón |
| 1968 | Rima Rothe de Vallbona | Noche en vela |
| 1968 | Alfonso Chase Brenes | Los juegos furtivos |
| 1969 | Julieta Pinto González | La estación que sigue al verano |
| 1970 | Luisa González Gutiérrez | A ras de suelo |
| 1971 | Carmen Naranjo Coto | Responso por el niño Juan Manuel |
| 1972 | None | |
| 1973 | Joaquín Gutiérrez Mangel | Murámonos Federico |
| 1974 | Otto Jiménez Quirós | El no iniciado |
| 1975 | Marco Tulio Aguilera Garramuño | Breve historia de todas las cosas |
| 1976 | Samuel Rovinski Gruszco | Ceremonia de casta |
| 1977 | Álvaro Dobles Rodríguez | El manchao |
| 1978 | Carlos Catania | Las varonesas |
| 1979 | Quince Duncan Moodie | Final de calle |
| 1980 | None | |
| 1981 | None | |
| 1982 | None | |
| 1983 | Adela Ferreto de Sáenz | Novela de los viajes y aventuras de Chico Paquito y sus duendes |
| 1984 | None | |
| 1985 | Anacristina Rossi Lara | María la noche |
| 1986 | José León Sánchez Alvarado | Tenochtitlán |
| 1987 | Carlos Luis Argüello Segura | El mundo de Juana Torres |
| 1988 | Hugo Rivas Ríos | Esa orilla sin nadie |
| 1989 | José León Sánchez Alvarado | Campanas para llamar al viento |
| 1990 | None | |
| 1991 | None | |
| 1992 | Alberto Cañas Escalante | Los molinos de Dios |
| 1993 | Daniel Gallegos Troyo | El pasado es un extraño país |
| 1994 | Julieta Pinto González | El despertar de Lázaro |
| 1995 | Fernando Contreras Castro | Los Peor |
| 1996 | Alfonso Chase Brenes | El pavo real y la mariposa |
| 1997 | Óscar Nuñez Olivas | El teatro circular |
| 1998 | None | |
| 1999 | Carlos Cortés Zúñiga | Cruz de olvido |
| 2000 | Fernando Contreras Castro | El tibio recinto de la oscuridad |
| 2000 | Tatiana Lobo Wiehoff | El año del laberinto |
| 2001 | Mario Zaldívar Rivera | Después de la luz roja |
| 2002 | Anacristina Rossi Lara | Limón Blues |
| 2003 | None | |
| 2004 | Tatiana Lobo Wiehoff | El corazón del silencio |
| 2005 | Uriel Quesada | El gato de sí mismo |
| 2006 | Froilán Escobar González | Ella estaba donde no se sabía |
| 2007 | Rodolfo Arias Formoso | Te llevaré en mis ojos |
| 2008 | Carlos Morales Castro | La rebelión de las avispas |
| 2009 | None | |
| 2010 | Jorge Méndez Limbrick | El laberinto del verdugo |
| 2010 | Daniel Quirós Ramírez | Verano rojo |
| 2011 | Warren Ulloa Argüello | Bajo la lluvia Dios no existe |
| 2011 | Alfonso Chacón Rodríguez | El luto de la libélula |
| 2012 | Jorge Jiménez Hernández | Soy el Enano de la mano larga-larga (novela alter-ego-maniaca) |
| 2013 | Rodolfo Arias Formoso | Guirnaldas (bajo tierra) |
| 2013 | Mirta González Suárez | Crimen con sonrisa |
| 2014 | Cyrus Shahnavaz Piedra | El diminuto corazón de la Iguana |
| 2015 | Alí Víquez Jiménez | El fuego cuando te quema |
| 2016 | Luis Diego Guillén Martínez | La alquimia de la Bestia |
| 2017 | Byron Enrique Salas Víquez | Mercurio en primavera |
| 2018 | Catalina Murillo Valverde | Maybe Managua |
| 2018 | Carla Pravisani | Mierda |
| 2019 | Guillermo Fernández Álvarez | El ojo del mundo |
| 2020 | Emilia Macaya | Más allá del río |
| 2020 | Larissa Rú | Cómo sobrevivir a una tormenta extranjera |
| 2021 | Paul Benavides | Los papeles de Chantall |
| 2022 | Carlos Fonseca Suárez | Austral |
| 2023 | José Morales González | Nos descuidamos un segundo |
| 2024 | Catalina Murillo Valverde | Una mujer insignificante |
| 2024 | Carlos Manuel Villalobos | Donde Nadie |

=== Short story ===
Winners of the Aquileo J. Echeverría National Prize: Short Story
| 1962 | None | |
| 1963 | Samuel Rovinski | La hora de los vencidos |
| 1964 | José Basileo Acuña | Tres cantares (El ángel que se quedó perdido) |
| 1965 | Alberto Cañas | |
| 1967 | José León Sánchez | |
| 1968 | Joaquín Gutiérrez | |
| 1970 | Julieta Pinto | |
| 1972 | Abel Pacheco | |
| 1974 | Carlos Luis Sáenz Elizondo | |
| 1975 | Alfonso Chase | |
| 1980 | Alberto Cañas | |
| 1981 | Fernando Durán Ayanegui | |
| 1982 | Francisco Escobar Abarca | |
| 1983 | Rodrigo Soto González | |
| 1986 | Fernando Durán Ayanegui | |
| 1988 | Fernando Durán Ayanegui | |
| 1989 | Fernando Durán Ayanegui | |
| 1990 | Uriel Quesada | El atardecer de los niños |
| 1993 | Tatiana Lobo | |
| 1994 | Carlos Luis Altamirano Vargas | |
| 1996 | Delfina Collado Aguilar | |
| 1997 | José Ricardo Chaves | |
| 1998 | Eduardo Vargas Ugalde | |
| 1999 | Myriam Bustos Arratia | |
| 2000 | Ernesto Rivera Casasola | |
| 2001 | Jacques Sagot Martino | |
| 2002 | Lara Ríos | |
| 2002 | Eduardo Vargas Ugalde | |
| 2003 | Enrique Castillo Barrantes | |
| 2004 | Myriam Bustos Arratia | |
| 2005 | Vernor Muñoz Villalobos | |
| 2006 | Rodrigo Soto González | |
| 2007 | Sonia Morales Solarte | |
| 2010 | Carlos Cortés Zúñiga | |
| 2010 | Rodolfo Arias Formoso | |
| 2011 | Faustino Desinach Cordero | |
| 2011 | Virgilio Mora Rodríguez | |
| 2012 | Carla Pravisani | |
| 2013 | Guillermo Fernández Álvarez | |
| 2014 | Karla Sterloff Umaña | |
| 2015 | Diego Van der Laat Alfaro | |
| 2016 | Arabella Salaverry | |
| 2017 | Guillermo Barquero Ureña | |
| 2018 | Cristopher Montero Corrales | |
| 2018 | Uriel Quesada | La invención y el olvido |
| 2019 | Camila Schumacher | |
| 2020 | Cristopher Reyes Loaiciga | |
| 2021 | Ana Lucía Fonseca | |
| 2022 | Larissa Rú | Monstruos bajo la lluvia |
| 2023 | Laura Zúñiga Hernández | Anatomía de la casa |
| 2024 | Carlos Regueyra Bonilla | Yeso |

=== Poetry ===
Winners of the Aquileo J. Echeverría National Prize: Poetry
| 1962 | Alfredo Cardona Peña | |
| 1963 | Arturo Echeverría Loría | |
| 1964 | Isaac Felipe Azofeifa | Canción |
| 1965 | None | |
| 1966 | Jorge Debravo | |
| 1966 | Alfonso Chase Brenes | |
| 1967 | Mario Picado Umaña | |
| 1968 | Julieta Dobles Izaguirre | |
| 1968 | Jorge Charpentier García | |
| 1969 | Isaac Felipe Azofeifa Bolaños | |
| 1970 | Eduardo Jenkins Dobles | |
| 1971 | Carlos Rafael Duverrán Porras | |
| 1972 | Mario Picado Umaña | |
| 1973 | None | |
| 1974 | Isaac Felipe Azofeifa Bolaños | Cima del gozo |
| 1975 | None | |
| 1976 | Julieta Dobles Izaguirre | |
| 1977 | Jorge Charpentier García | |
| 1978 | Floria Jiménez Díaz | |
| 1979 | Carlos de la Ossa Thompson | |
| 1980 | Laureano Albán Rivas | |
| 1980 | Alfredo Cardona Peña | |
| 1981 | Jorge Charpentier García | |
| 1981 | Carlos Rafael Duverrán Porras | |
| 1982 | Janina Fernández Pacheco | |
| 1983 | Carlos Francisco Monge Meza | |
| 1984 | None | |
| 1985 | Mía Gallegos Domínguez | |
| 1986 | None | |
| 1987 | Rosita Kalina | |
| 1988 | Juan Antillón Montealegre | |
| 1989 | Mario Picado Umaña | |
| 1990 | Carlos Francisco Monge Meza | |
| 1991 | Milton Zárate Arguedas | |
| 1992 | Julieta Dobles Izaguirre | |
| 1993 | Laureano Albán Rivas | |
| 1994 | Mayra Jiménez Rodríguez | |
| 1995 | Alfonso Chase Brenes | |
| 1996 | Guillermo Fernández Álvarez | |
| 1996 | José María Zonta Arias | |
| 1997 | Julieta Dobles Izaguirre | |
| 1998 | José María Zonta Arias | |
| 1999 | Milton Zárate Arguedas | |
| 2000 | Marta Royo Vargas | |
| 2001 | Ronald Bonilla Carvajal | |
| 2002 | Carlos Francisco Monge Meza | |
| 2002 | Xenia Gordienko Orlich | |
| 2003 | Julieta Dobles Izaguirre | |
| 2004 | Rodolfo Dada Fumero | |
| 2005 | Vivian Cruz Serrano | |
| 2006 | Mía Gallegos Domínguez | |
| 2007 | Erick Gil Salas Sanabria | |
| 2008 | Erick Gil Salas Sanabria | |
| 2009 | Lil Picado González | |
| 2010 | Silvia Castro Méndez | |
| 2010 | Alexánder Obando Bolaños | |
| 2011 | Alfredo Trejos Ortiz | |
| 2011 | Juan Carlos Olivas Solano | |
| 2012 | Luis Chaves Campos | |
| 2013 | Osvaldo Sauma Aguilar | La canción del oficio |
| 2013 | Diana Ávila Solera | Gramática del sueño |
| 2014 | Esteban Ureña Salazar | Minutos después del accidente |
| 2015 | Mario Salas Muñoz | Un adiós para John Lennon |
| 2016 | Mauricio Molina Delgado | Treinta y seis daguerrotipos de Diotima desnuda |
| 2017 | Alfredo Trejos | Prusia |
| 2017 | José María Zonta | El libro de la Dinastía de Bambú |
| 2018 | Alejandro Marín Solano | El sol púrpura |
| 2019 | Arabella Salaverry | Búscame en la palabra: poesía escogida (1963 - 2018) |
| 2020 | Mía Gallegos Domínguez | Para alcanzar la espuma: poesía escogida (1976-2018) |
| 2021 | Diego Mora | Brea |
| 2022 | Pablo Narval | Balada de un hombre con sida |
| 2023 | Gustavo Solórzano | La culpa |
| 2024 | Edmundo Retana | El incendio del ser |

=== Drama ===
Winners of the Aquileo J. Echeverría National Prize: Drama
| 1994 | Alberto Bonilla | |
| 1997 | Jorge Arroyo | Mata Hari: Sentencia para una aurora |
| 2003 | Jorge Arroyo | Notario de la patria inedita |
| 2004 | Jorge Arroyo | La tea fulgurante: Juan Santamaría o las iras de un dios |
| 2005 | Ana Istarú | La loca |
| 2008 | Jorge Arroyo | La Romería |
| 2010 | Arnoldo Ramos Vargas | Do, Re y Mi disonante |
| 2016 | Bryan Vindas Villarreal | Tres pesadillas de un hombre con cabeza de gato |
| 2018 | Alejandra Marín Solera | Hogar, dulce hogar |
| 2019 | Bryan Vindas | La balada post-futurista de los moluscos |
| 2020 | Kyle Boza Gómez | Nuestro muertos |
| 2021 | Roxana Ávila y David Korish | Dramaturgia invisible: 30 años de teatro Abya Yala |
| 2022 | Bryan Vindas Villareal | Manifiesto sobre la extinción de Babel |
| 2023 | José Fernando Álvarez Mejía | Erasmus |
| 2024 | Bernardo Mena Young | Catástrofe y abandono: Dos reescrituras a partir de las obras de Sófocles |
