= Magón National Prize for Culture =

The Magón National Prize for Culture (Premio Nacional de Cultura Magón) is an award given by the government of Costa Rica, through its Ministry of Youth, Culture, and Sport, to a Costa Rican citizen in recognition of their life's work in the cultural field. It was created in 1961 by Law 2901 and amended in 1993 by Law 7345.

The prize's name is in homage to writer Manuel González Zeledón (1864–1936), who wrote under the nom-de-plume "Magón". It has been awarded annually since 1962.

== Magón Prize winners ==
Magón Prize Winners
Year	Winner
2022	José María Gutierrez
2021	Arabella Salaverry; Fernando Carballo
2020	Juan Luis Rodríguez
2019	Isabel Campabadal
2018	José Sancho
2017	José León Sánchez
2016	Juan Jaramillo Antillón
2015	Rónald Bonilla
2014	Miguel Ángel Quesada Pacheco
2013	Julieta Dobles
2012	Yadira Calvo Fajardo
2011	Rodrigo Gámez Lobo and Rogelio López
2010	Ólger Villegas
2009	Virginia Pérez-Ratton
2008	Rafael Ángel García
2007	María Eugenia Dengo
2006	Laureano Albán Rivas
2005	Eugenio Rodríguez Vega
2004	Carlos Aguilar Piedra
2003	Hilda Chen Apuy Espinoza
2002	Rafael Fernández Piedra
2001	María Eugenia Bozzoli Vargas
2000	Benjamín Gutiérrez Sáenz
1999	Alfonso Chase Brenes
1998	Daniel Gallegos Troyo
1997	Jorge Charpentier García
1996	Julieta Pinto González
1995	Lola Fernández Caballero
1994	Carlos Enrique Vargas Méndez
1993	Carlos Meléndez Chaverri
1992	Néstor Zeledón Guzmán
1991	Arnoldo Herrera González
1990	Dinorah Bolandi Jiménez
1989	Fernando Centeno Güell
1988	Guido Sáenz González
1987	Luis Ferrero Acosta
1986	Carmen Naranjo Coto
1985	Alfredo Cardona Peña
1984	Arturo Agüero Chaves
1983	José Basileo Acuña Zeledón
1982	Juan Manuel Sánchez Barrantes
1981	Manuel de la Cruz González Luján
1980	Isaac Felipe Azofeifa Bolaños
1979	Rafael Obregón Loría
1978	Lilia Ramos Valverde
1977	Rafael Lucas Rodríguez Caballero
1976	Alberto Cañas Escalante
1975	Joaquín Gutiérrez Mangel
1974	Teodorico Quirós Alvarado
1973	Francisco Zúñiga Chavarría
1972	León Pacheco Solano
1971	Juan Rafael Chacón Solares
1970	Francisco Amighetti Ruiz
1969	Luis Felipe González Flores
1968	Fabián Dobles Rodríguez
1967	José Marín Cañas
1966	Carlos Luis Sáenz Elizondo
1965	Carlos Luis Fallas; Hernán Peralta Quirós
1964	Carlos Salazar Herrera
1963	Julián Marchena Valleriestra
1962	Moisés Vincenzi Pacheco
