= Adrián Arguedas Ruano =

Costa Rican contemporary artist

- Born: 1968 (age 57–58); Barva, Heredia province, Costa Rica
- Education: Universidad Nacional de Costa Rica, Écoles Beaux d'Art en Lorient, France, University of Miami
- Known for: Contemporary art
- Awards: Premios Nacionales Aquileo J. Echeverría

Adrián Arguedas Ruano (born 1968) is a Costa Rican contemporary artist who works in painting, printmaking and sculpture.

== Early life and education ==
Arguedas was born and raised in Barva de Heredia. He graduated from the School of Arts and Visual Communication of the National University of Costa Rica in 1990 with a Bachelor of Arts degree. Between 1993-1994, he studied engraving at the École des beaux arts in Lorient, France. In 2000, he received a Master of Fine Arts degree from the University of Miami, Florida, United States.

Arguedas is a professor in the School of Arts and Visual Communication at the Universidad Nacional de Costa Rica.

== Collections ==
- Museo de Arte Costarricense, San José, Costa Rica
- Museo de Arte y Diseño Contemporáneo, San José, Costa Rica
- Marcelo Narbona, Ciudad de Panamá, Panamá
- Museum of Latin American Art Long Beach, California
- Caja Costarricense de Seguro Social, San José, Costa Rica
- Museos de Banco Central, San José, Costa Rica

== Awards ==
In 1994, 2004 and 2007, Arguedas received the Premio Nacional Aquileo J. Echeverría award, which is the highest award in Costa Rica in the field of visual arts. In 2019 he received the Francisco Amighetti National Visual Arts Award in sculpture for his exhibition El Aprendiz.

== Selected exhibitions ==
- Cuidado ¡Pinta! o (De)construcciones pictóricas, Museum of Contemporary Art and Design, San Jose, Costa Rica
- Construcciones, Invenciones, Museo de Arte y Diseño Contemporáneo, San Jose, Costa Rica.
- El Aprendiz, Museo del Banco Central de Costa Rica, San Jose.
- "Gráfica America", Museum of Latin American Art, Long Beach, California

== Books ==
- "El Aprendiz" Adrian Arguedas Ruano | Maria Jose Monge Picado | 1ed. 104Pgs.. 28x22cm | Fundación Museos Banco Central de Costa Rica, 2019
- "Grabados" Adrian Arguedas Ruano | Efrain Hernández | 1ed. 39Pgs. 28cm | Prensa Digital WILKO, San José, 2014.
- "SUPER HEROES" Adrian Arguedas Ruano | Calvo Campos Esteban | 1ed. 70Pgs.. 28cm | San José: Museo de Arte Costarricense, 2007 ISBN 978-9968-9763-6-7
