= 1990 Costa Rican general election =

- 4 February 1990
- Presidential election
- Registered: 1,692,050
- Turnout: 81.81% (▼0.01pp)
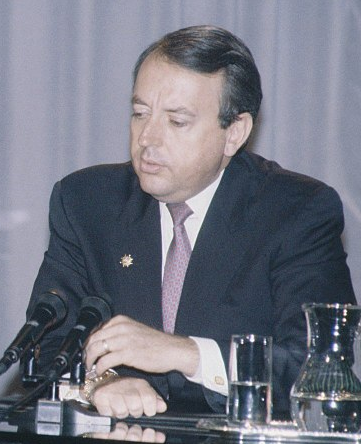

Nominee	Rafael Ángel Calderón	Carlos Manuel Castillo
Party	PUSC	PLN
Running mate	Germán Serrano; Arnoldo López	Eugenio Rodríguez; Meta Figueres
Popular vote	694,589	636,701
Percentage	51.49%	47.20%
- Results by district Calderón: 40–50% 50–60% 60–70% 70–80% Castillo: 40–50% 50–60% 60–70% 70–80% 80–90% Tie: 40–50%
President before election
Oscar Arias
PLN
Elected President
Rafael Ángel Calderón Fournier
PUSC
- Legislative election
- All 57 seats in the Legislative Assembly; 29 seats needed for a majority
- Turnout: 81.79% (▼0.02pp)
Party	Leader	Vote %	Seats	+/–
PUSC	Rafael Ángel Calderón	46.21	29	+4
PLN	Carlos Manuel Castillo	41.88	25	−4
PU	Víctor Daniel Camacho	3.31	1	0
PUGEN	Carlos Alberto Fernández	2.42	1	+1
PUAC	Juan Guillermo Brenes	1.06	1	0
This lists parties that won seats. See the complete results below.
Results by province

General elections were held in Costa Rica on 4 February 1990. Rafael Ángel Calderón Fournier of the Social Christian Unity Party (PUSC) won the presidential election, whilst his party also won the parliamentary election. Voter turnout was 81.8%.

Unlike previous elections, Calderon's nomination was not undisputed. Despite expressing that he would not run again for President after the results of the previous race, he was eventually convinced by his followers. Yet, young former minister and business man Miguel Ángel Rodríguez Echeverría from the liberal faction inside PUSC choose to face Calderón at the primaries. Former deputy José Hine from PUSC's left wing also run with testimonial results.

Despite the fact that Rodríguez clearly had no chance against Calderón, his candidacy was considered a smart move, as he would start to be in the spotlight and helping his way in future nominations. As expected, Calderón won the primary election with 75% of the votes. On the other sidewalk former vice president Carlos Manuel Castillo won over young minister Rolando Araya Monge (nephew of ex-president Luis Alberto Monge) in the PLN's primaries after a very hostile and traumatic campaign, in which Castillo even accused Araya of links with narcotraffic, something that weakened the PLN. Minor parties proliferated in this election, with up to 12 different parties taking part, of which only left-wing coalition United People having some relevance with sociologist Victor Daniel Camacho as nominee earning 3% of the votes.

== Results ==
=== President ===
Candidate	Party	Votes	%
Rafael Ángel Calderón Fournier	Social Christian Unity Party	694,589	51.49
Carlos Manuel Castillo Morales	National Liberation Party	636,701	47.20
Víctor Daniel Camacho Monge	United People	9,217	0.68
Fernando Ramírez Muñoz	Christian National Alliance Party	4,209	0.31
Isaac Felipe Azofeifa	Party of Progress	2,547	0.19
Edwin Badilla Agüero	Militant Workers Revolutionary Party	1,005	0.07
Rodrigo Alberto Cordero	Independent Party	746	0.06
Total		1,349,014	100.00
Valid votes		1,349,014	97.45
Invalid votes		29,919	2.16
Blank votes		5,393	0.39
Total votes		1,384,326	100.00
Registered voters/turnout		1,692,050	81.81
Source: Election Resources

==== By province ====
Province	Calderón %	Castillo %	Camacho %	Ramírez %	Azofeifa%	Badilla %	Cordero %
San José	49.39	49.25	0.75	0.28	0.22	0.06	0.05
Alajuela	51.41	47.59	0.43	0.32	0.15	0.06	0.05
Cartago	50.37	48.57	0.53	0.20	0.19	0.08	0.06
Heredia	50.76	47.79	0.73	0.36	0.25	0.05	0.05
Guanacaste	52.72	46.39	0.44	0.24	0.09	0.07	0.05
Puntarenas	56.21	42.24	0.82	0.40	0.15	0.11	0.07
Limón	60.82	37.07	1.06	0.58	0.16	0.21	0.11
Total	51.51	47.20	0.66	0.31	0.19	0.07	0.06

=== Legislative Assembly ===
Party	Votes	%	Seats	+/–
Social Christian Unity Party	617,478	46.21	29	+4
National Liberation Party	559,632	41.88	25	–4
United People	44,161	3.31	1	0
General Union Party	32,307	2.42	1	+1
Christian National Alliance Party	22,149	1.66	0	0
Cartago Agrarian Union Party	14,190	1.06	1	0
National Independent Party	10,635	0.80	0	New
Party of Progress	7,733	0.58	0	New
Alajuelense Solidarity Party	7,330	0.55	0	0
Independent Party	5,564	0.42	0	0
Authentic Limonense Party	4,901	0.37	0	0
Agrarian Labour Action Party	4,756	0.36	0	New
National Agrarian Party	4,594	0.34	0	New
Militant Workers Revolutionary Party	742	0.06	0	New
Total	1,336,172	100.00	57	0
Valid votes	1,336,172	96.55		
Invalid votes	32,723	2.36		
Blank votes	15,061	1.09		
Total votes	1,383,956	100.00		
Registered voters/turnout	1,692,050	81.79		
Source: Election Resources

==== By province ====
Province	PUSC		PLN		PU		PUGEN		ANC		PNI		PdP		Others	
Province	%	S	%	S	%	S	%	S	%	S	%	S	%	S	%	S
San José	44.41	10	43.08	9	4.50	1	3.77	1	1.86	0	0.91	0	0.70	0	0.84	0
Alajuela	46.90	5	43.47	5	1.43	0	0.55	0	1.41	0	0.46	0	0.39	0	5.39	0
Cartago	43.22	3	40.71	2	2.71	0	1.58	0	0.95	0	0.85	0	0.54	0	9.44	1
Heredia	46.87	3	42.91	2	4.38	0	1.84	0	1.75	0	0.80	0	1.16	0	0.29	0
Guanacaste	50.52	3	46.12	2	1.00	0	0.57	0	0.97	0	0.61	0	0.10	0	0.11	0
Puntarenas	49.87	3	38.30	3	2.96	0	4.60	0	2.30	0	1.24	0	0.33	0	0.39	0
Limón	50.14	2	29.44	2	4.11	0	0.62	0	2.18	0	0.51	0	0.53	0	12.47	0
Total	46.21	29	41.88	25	3.31	1	2.42	1	1.66	0	0.80	0	0.58	0	3.14	1

=== Local governments ===
Party	Votes	%	Seats			
Party	Votes	%	Alderpeople	+/–	Municipal syndics	+/–
Social Christian Unity Party	623,021	46.70	274	+42	265	+151
National Liberation Party	569,974	42.72	232	–28	161	–145
United People	44,765	3.36	6	+3	0	0
General Union Party	28,243	2.12	4	+2	0	0
Christian National Alliance Party	17,411	1.30	2	+2	0	0
National Independent Party	12,836	0.96	0	0	0	0
Party of Progress	7,815	0.59	0	New	0	New
Agrarian Labour Action Party	5,444	0.41	3	New	0	New
Alajuelense Solidarity Party	5,298	0.40	0	–1	0	0
National Agrarian Party	5,017	0.38	2	New	0	New
Independent Party	4,492	0.34	1	+1	0	0
Authentic Limonense Party	3,744	0.28	1	0	0	0
National Union Party	2,221	0.17	0	New	0	New
New Alajuelita Party	2,012	0.15	1	0	0	0
Humanist Party	1,929	0.14	0	New	0	New
Total	1,334,222	100.00	526	+22	426	+6
Valid votes	1,334,222	96.42				
Invalid/blank votes	49,520	3.58				
Total votes	1,383,742	100.00				
Registered voters/turnout	1,691,689	81.80				
Source: TSE
