= Manuel González Zeledón =

Costa Rican writer (1864–1936)

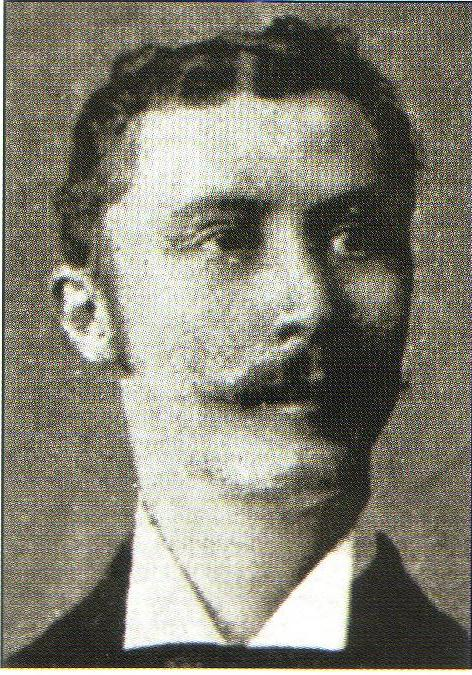
Manuel González Zeledón 1894

Manuel González Zeledón (24 December 1864 – 29 May 1936) was a Costa Rican writer. Writing under the nom-de-plume "Magón", he also worked to promote culture and literature in the country.

While his literary output was not prolific, he is remembered for works that serve to cast light on the people and culture of Costa Rica.

Born in San José, he began his writing career on the newspaper La Patria, which at the time was edited by the writer Aquileo J. Echeverría. Later, in conjunction with other writers, he founded the newspaper El País, opposing clerical interference in the government of the country.

In 1932, he was appointed ambassador to the United States, and made his last return to Costa Rica on May 16th, 1936. The ambassador returned to his native country, ill, and died on May 29th, 1936. He was 71 years old.

== See also ==
- Magón National Prize for Culture, Costa Rica's highest cultural award, named in his honour.
