= Fernando Contreras Castro =

Fernando Contreras Castro is a Costa Rican writer who was born in the province of Alajuela, on January 4, 1963. He is an author of new classics in the national literature. He teaches in the School of Communication in the University of Costa Rica.

Contreras helps to form a new Costa Rican narrative which breaks with the costumbrism of the 40 generation and with the urban generation of the 60's, and along with other writers like Anacristina Rossi, Rodolfo Arias Formoso, Tatiana Lobo and Ana Istarú, part of the so-called generation of disenchantment.

== Studies ==
He obtained his Bachelor in Spanish and MA in Spanish Literature in the University of Costa Rica, for which presented a preliminary investigation "Man of La Mancha", which is a reading of "Don Quixote" on Using Nietzsche's philosophical conception. His doctorate in literature was obtained in France.

== Published books ==
- Única mirando al mar: A novel published in 1993 for the first time (ABC Publishers) immediately became a success, the theme was the misery of the twentieth century, from the Rio Azu garbage. That novel became a reading Costa Rican educational system. In 2010, published under the seal of Editorial Legado a new version rebuilt in its entirety. The author narrates the same story differently, applying what Contreras called "economy of language" and adding a significant change in the final.
- Los Peor:: Novel published in 1995. It won the National Award Aquileo J Echeverria, highest award for literature in Costa Rica. The theme is the adventures of Jerónimo Peor, and his protégé Polifemo.
- Urbanoscopio and Sonambulario: Books of stories published in 1997 and 2005 respectively.

El tibio recinto de la oscuridad: Novel published in 2000, won the National Award Aquileo J. Echeverria, highest award for literature in Costa Rica. Describes his recurring theme of misery, this time from an asylum.

- Cantos de las guerras preventivas: A novel written in free verse, published in 2006, in which the author explores the consequences of war from a more global story.
- Cierto Azul: Short novel published in 2009, the author returns to the streets of the city of San Jose, but this time through the eyes of a cat, Freddie Freeloader, the adoptive father of Arthur a blind child who learns to his tutors, a sextet jazz cats that plays in the soffitto of the Central Market.
