= Arturo Agüero Chaves =

Costa Rican poet and philologist (1907–2001)

Arturo Agüero Chaves (March 28, 1907 – May 11, 2001), was a Costa Rican writer, poet, philologist, lexicographer and educator. Along with Aquileo J. Echeverría, he is one of the greatest exponents of Costa Rican costumbrismo. He is also considered the father of modern linguistics in Costa Rica.

== Life and career ==
Born Pedro Piedades Chaves Umaña in San José, Costa Rica, on March 28, 1907, he was the illegitimate son of Engracia Chaves Umaña and José María Agüero Barboza. After losing his mother to tuberculosis at the age of 15, Pedro Chaves moved in with his father and changed his name to Arturo Agüero Chaves. By the time he was 21 years old, Agüero was already publishing his poetry in local newspapers. He studied at Escuela Normal de Heredia and began his career as a Latin and Spanish Literature professor in 1929. While teaching at Liceo de Costa Rica and Instituto de Alajuela, Agüero made a name for himself as a prominent educator. He went on to serve as principal at various Costa Rican public schools and as a Spanish language teacher in Florida in the late 1940s. When the first Costa Rican college of humanities was founded at the University of Costa Rica, Agüero was among its first-ever faculty members. At University of Costa Rica, he engaged in extensive research on philology and became one of the University's most distinguished professors. Agüero published most of his literary work during his 15 years as Chair of the Department of Philology, Linguistics and Literature at University of Costa Rica.

In 1955, having achieved national renown as a poet and philologist, he was elected to the Academia Costarricense de la Lengua (English: Costa Rican Academy of the Language), over which he would preside from 1981 until his death in 2001. As an academician, Agüero's linguistic research would extend beyond Costa Rica, earning him membership in numerous language academies, including the Real Academia Española (English: Royal Spanish Academy), the Academia Hondureña de la Lengua (English: Honduran Academy of Language), and the North American Academy of the Spanish Language. Furthermore, Agüero's role as Director of the Costa Rican Academy of the Language would get him acquainted with Spanish writers Dámaso Alonso and Camilo José Cela, who would later become his personal friends.

Besides his poetry and academic work, Arturo Agüero also gained recognition for his columns in Costa Rican newspapers La Nación and La Prensa Libre. Agüero died at age 94 on May 11, 2001. Upon news of his demise, Costa Rican journalists were not able to list the extensive number of awards that Agüero had received throughout his career.

== Awards and recognitions ==
- In 1949, he received the National Prize for Poetry.
- In 1955, he received the National Prize for Costumbrista Poetry.
- In 1963, he was bestowed the Officer's badge of the Ordre des Palmes Académiques by the French government.
- In 1967, he was awarded with the Nicaraguan Orden de Rubén Darío.
- In 1975, he was given the title professor emeritus of the University of Costa Rica.
- He was bestowed honorary citizenship in San Ramón in 1978, and in Alajuela in 1979.
- In 1984, he received the Magón National Prize for Culture, the highest honour awarded by the Costa Rican government to national artists and intellectuals.
- In 1997, he became Doctor Honoris Causa of the University of Costa Rica.
- In 1999, Felipe VI of Spain named him an Honorary Member of the Foundation "Monasteries of San Millán de la Cogolla".
- In 2003, the University of Costa Rica's Western Campus library was named after him.
- He was named "Guest of Honor" in Tampa, Mexico City, Puebla City, Paris, Managua and Lima.

== Works ==
=== Poetry ===
- El Romancero Tico (1940)
- La Lechuza (1950)

=== Philology ===
- Estudios Lingüísticos desde la Antigüedad hasta 1800
- Historia de la Lingüística
- Crónicas del Segundo Congreso de Academias de la Lengua Española
- Nuevas Normas de Prosodia y Ortología
- El Español de América y Costa Rica (1962)
- Literatura y Gramática Castellana (1963)
- Literatura y Gramática Españolas (1968)
- El Español de América (1973)
- Origen y Desarrollo de la Lingüística (1977)
- Diccionario de Costarriqueñismos y Fonología y Fonética Españolas (1996)
