= Mirta González Suárez =

Costa Rican writer, psychologist (b. 1948)

- Born: September 29, 1948 (age 78); San José, Costa Rica
- Occupation: Emeritus Professor

Academic background
- Education: Autonomous University of Madrid

Academic work
- Discipline: Psychology, Women's studies
- Sub-discipline: Social psychology Feminist psychology, Political psychology
- Institutions: University of Costa Rica

Mirta González Suárez (born September 29, 1948) is a Costa Rican social psychologist and novelist. She is an emeritus professor of psychology at the University of Costa Rica, where she has conducted research in women's studies and political psychology. Her first novel, Crimen con sonrisa (Crime with a Smile), won a national literary award, the Aquileo J. Echeverría National Prize, in 2013. In 2016 she won the award "UNA palabra" by the National University of Costa Rica for her novel "La gobernadora" and in 2021 the "Juegos Florales Hispanoamericanos de Quetzaltenango 2021" for the novel "La Independencia".

== Early life and education ==
González Suárez was born in San José, Costa Rica, in 1948. She earned her PhD in psychology from the Autonomous University of Madrid in 1987, with a dissertation on sexism in Costa Rican education. While pursuing her doctoral studies, she earned a Fulbright Award, which she used to compare sexism in American and Costa Rican texts.

== Academia ==
González Suárez is a professor emeritus of psychology at the University of Costa Rica. Her research interests include sexism in education, discrimination, and political psychology. She has published more than 50 works in Spanish, including books and peer-reviewed articles.

González Suárez was the first director of the University of Costa Rica/National University of Costa Rica joint Women's Studies graduate program. She was the deputy director of the Centre for Research in Women's Studies at the University of Costa Rica. In 1993, she chaired the organizing committee for the Fifth International Interdisciplinary Congress on Women, held in San José. In 2008 a writing award in her name was created at the University of Costa Rica.

== Writing ==
González Suárez published her first novel, Crimen con sonrisa (Crime with a Smile), in 2013; it was awarded Costa Rica's Aquileo J. Echeverria National Literary Award. Her 2016 novel, La Gobernadora (The Governor), won the UNA Palabra Prize from the National University of Costa Rica.

== Selected works ==
=== Academic books ===
- González Suárez, Mirta (1988). Estudios de la mujer: conocimiento y cambio (Women's Studies: Knowledge and Change). Editorial Universitaria Centroamericana. ISBN 9977-30-112-3. OCLC 19628865.
- González Suárez, Mirta (1990). El sexismo en la educación: la discriminación cotidiana (Sexism in Education: Everyday Discrimination). San José, Costa Rica: Editorial UCR. ISBN 9977-67-123-0. OCLC 22662864.
- González Suárez, Mirta (2008). Psicología política (Political Psychology). San José, Costa Rica: Editorial UCR. ISBN 978-9968-936-78-1. OCLC 422754297.

=== Journal articles ===
- González Suárez, Mirta (2002). "Feminismo, academia y cambio social (Feminism, academia and social change)". Educación. 26 (2): 169–183. doi:10.15517/revedu.v26i2.2913. ISSN 2215-2644.
- González Suárez, Mirta (2011). "Agenda política del movimiento de mujeres: demandas de inicios del siglo XXI (Political agenda of the women's movement: Demands from the beginning of the 21st century)". Revista Reflexiones. 90 (1): 9–22.
- González Suárez, Mirta (2013). "Psicología política y feminismo (Political psychology and feminism)". Revista Psicologia Política. 13 (28): 507–523.

=== Novels ===
- González Suárez, Mirta (2013). Crimen con sonrisa (Crime with a smile). Ciudad Universitaria Rodrigo Facio, Costa Rica: Editorial UCR. ISBN 978-9968-46-392-8. OCLC 882283084.
- González Suárez, Mirta (2017). La gobernadora (The Governor). Heredia, Costa Rica: EUNA. ISBN 978-9977-65-485-0. OCLC 1021956928.
- La independencia (2021), Juegos Florales Hispanoamericanos de Quetzaltenango
