= Jorge Arroyo =

Costa Rican writer

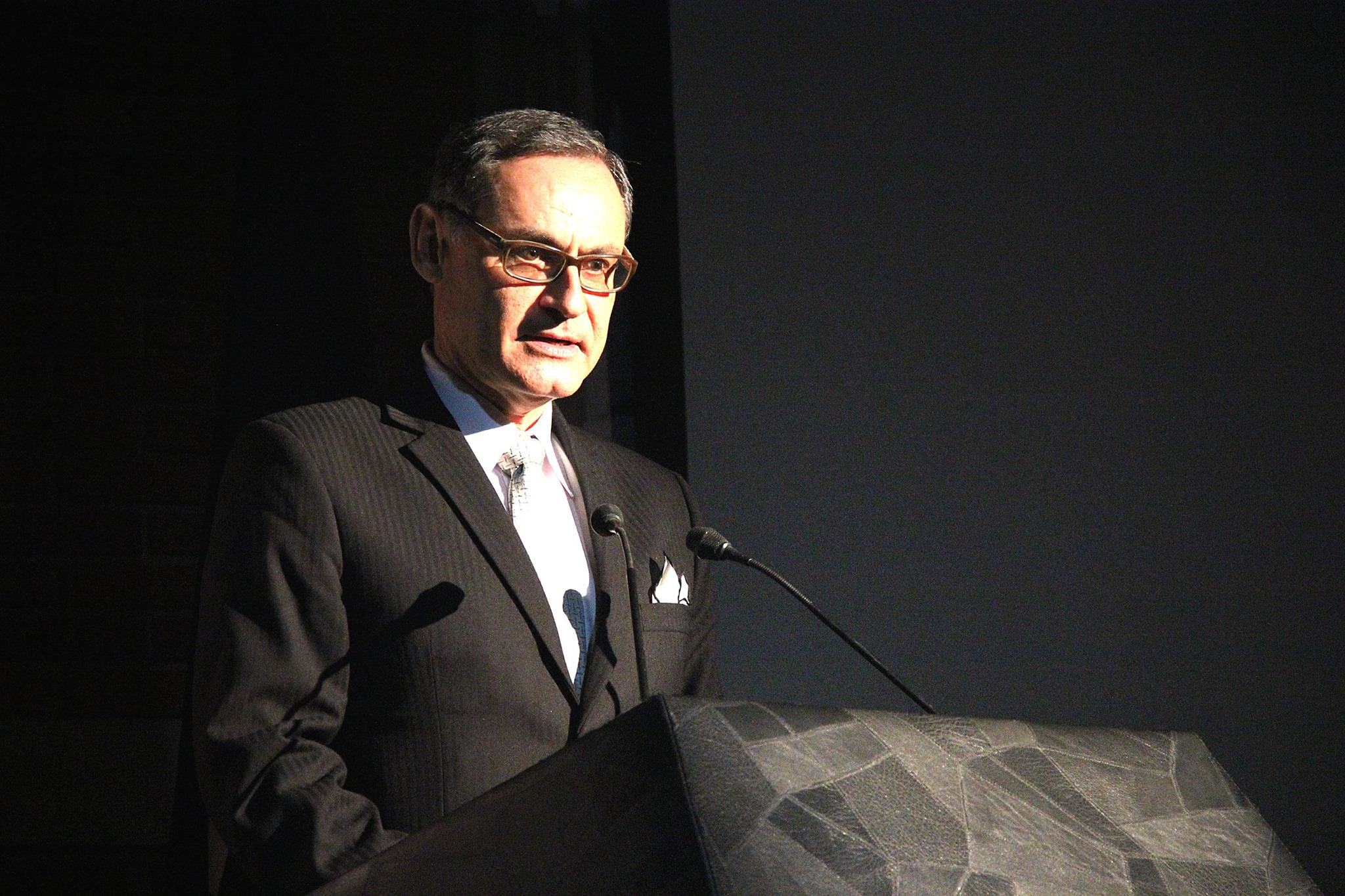
- Born: Jorge Eduardo Arroyo-Pérez; 1959 (age 66–67); San José, Costa Rica
- Occupations: author and playwright

Jorge Eduardo Arroyo-Pérez (born in San José in 1959) is a Costa Rican writer, playwright, opinion columnist, essayist, poet and theater director. He is currently Costa Rica's ambassador to UNESCO.

The only author to receive four times the National Award in Theatre (Premio Nacional Aquileo J. Echeverría) (1996, 2003, 2004 and 2008), the most important recognition given to dramatists in Costa Rica. More than 40 of his plays have been staged in Costa Rica, Panama, Venezuela, Puerto Rico, Bolivia and Brazil and he has been translated to Portuguese and English. He has fourteen published books and he is also part of the Drama contemporáneo costarricense (Contemporary Costa Rican Drama) .

His creative and aesthetic approaches to theatre are varied, embracing a wide range of genres from comedy and drama to didactic texts, lavish postmodern spectacles and multitudinous historic recreations that have been presented in theatres, stadiums and huge open air venues. Theme-wise, he is also bountiful, but humorous wit and keen insight on his characters are common in all his work. He's the author of the first Central American postmodern play, the first Costa Rican play of gay theatre and has been recognized as the “most historian of Costa Rican playwrights”.

He holds an abundant corpus of opinion columns, reports and essays published in national and international magazines and in Costa Rican newspapers during 35 years. His collaborations in newspaper columns and specialized magazines add up to hundreds of articles in La Nación newspaper and others and he has been praised as an anthropological journalist. He has also worked as an actor, cultural promoter and producer.

== Early life and education ==
He was born in San José, Costa Rica in 1959, but he grew up in the province of Alajuela. Many Costa Rican customs and traditions that can be found throughout his work derive from the experiences acquired during this stage. He was an outstanding student in Escuela República de Guatemala, a public primary school. He received High School education in a private school ran by Spanish priests. In 1977 he enters Law School in the University of Costa Rica and two years later enrolled in the School of Dramatic Arts of that same university. He graduates in Dramatic Arts in 1982 and at the same time starts acting and winning, consequently, the National Award of best debutant actor of that year.

== Career ==
Very early in his career Arroyo incurred into the literary world through poetry with his books Para Aprisionar Nostalgias (To imprison Nostalgia) in 1983, which won him the es:Premio Joven Creación (Young Creation Award), given by the National Authors Association of Costa Rica and the Editorial Costa Rica, and Cuerpo de mimbre (Body of Osier) in 1984, which won the UNA Palabra Award given by the National University of Costa Rica.

At the same time he starts to write for the stage. From his earliest productions his plays have generated praise among audiences and critics. His first comedy L’ ánima sola de Chico Muñoz (The Forlorn Soul of Chico Muñoz) (1985) became Costa Rica's longest-running play for many years. His work generated great demand and in 1986 his play La chupeta electrónica (The Electronic Pacifier) was another audience success, followed in 1987 by Con la honra en el alambre (Virtue Hanging by a Thread) based on Maupassant’s short story Le Rosier de Madame Husson. In this stage he also writes Fantasma por error (A Mistaken Ghost) (1989). With the revival of this play in Panama in 2005, Arroyo was granted that country's Anita Villalaz National Award for best foreign play. This play was staged for a third time in 2007, at the Teatro Municipal de Alajuela.

This first plays develop popular characters and humorous situations, rescuing oral traditions and aesthetically re-elaborating mechanisms and themes used in the early 20th century.

=== 80’s and 90’s ===
In further work the author deepens into more lyrical and personal theatre, not exempted of political connotations. He also revisits contemporary history icons, deepening into their personal lives and social drama, questioning what has been written in official texts. In this line of work he writes Mata Hari: sentencia para una aurora (Mata Hari: A Dawn’s Sentence) (1987). Here he re- interprets the life of Mata Hari as a victim of the forces that be rather than the alleged double agent that faced trial for espionage. It was written during Arroyo's stay in the United States in the International Writing Program (IWP) founded by Paul Engle at the University of Iowa, and it earned him his first Aquileo J. Echeverría National Award. This play also gained him international recognition for it was also presented in Puerto Rico, Venezuela and later on, translated and staged in Brazil in 2002–2003. Arroyo broke new ground again in 1991 with his play La aventura del café (The Coffee Adventure). This tourist oriented play re-enacts the history of coffee, a product of the utmost importance for Costa Rican economy. This was the first play of its kind in Costa Rica and in 1995 received the award for Tourism Excellence by American Sightseeing International.

His auto sacramental La entrada de Jesús en Jerusalén (The entry of Jesus into Jerusalem) was represented in the streets of Alajuela in 1995.

In 1997 Arroyo writes the huge open air spectacles Albores (Dawnings) and Leyendas (Legends), both dealing with Costa Rican traditions and history. These works would originate one of his most lavish and important works, the monumental play La tertulia de los espantos (The Soiree of Spooks). As it prologue reads, this play takes us “from the legend and myths of the creation of the world to the postmodern fragmentation of the spectacle” . This text re-elaborates what Arroyo did in his first years and presents it with the style and showmanship of contemporary theatre. This piece is considered the first Central American postmodern play.

His further work shifts again to more personal and lyrical theatre, as in the contemporary piece El surco entre la flor y el labio (The Groove between the Flower and the Lip) (1997) that deals with the crisis of the female role in society of a mother and a daughter. From that same year is also Azul Marlene (Marlene Blue). Set in a Nazi prison at the end of World War II, Arroyo confronts us with the harsh reality of a homosexual prisoner of that time. This is considered the first piece of gay theatre in Costa Rica, and probably in the Central American region.

=== 2000s ===
In 2002 his comedy Trio was mounted in Panama with huge success among audiences and critics alike. With this play Arroyo shows us again his enormous ability to manage different styles and genres, presenting us a comedy on a practically bare staged where three best friends, a woman a two men, take us through a roller coaster ride of emotions swiftly jumping from the past to the present. In that same year he presented the reading of Valentino, la soledad del halcón (Valentino, the Falcon’s Loneliness), the author's personal take on the life of the immortal Rodolfo Valentino.

His most recent and mature works develop historical theatrelike in La patria primera (Prime Country) (2002), about the Costa Rican Independence, and Figueroa Notario de la patria inédita (Figueroa: Notary of a Country Untold) (2003) a monumental four-act play set in 19th-century Costa Rica that retells the life of José Maria Figueroa, the impetuous and restless explorer and adventurer who shook the prude society of the time. This historical character is best known as the author of the El Album de Figueroa (The Figueroa Collection), a collection of drawings, maps, family trees, newspaper clippings, guarded by Costa Rica's National Archive as one of the country's most valued possessions and part of UNESCO’s World Heritage. This play gained the author another Aquileo J. Echeverría National Award.

On another line of work this dramatist has developed a pioneer program in several high schools around the country in order to promote theater as well as recruit new young talents. To achieve this plan, Jorge Arroyo relayed with the collaboration of one of the most recognized actor and producer in the country Roberto Zeledón. They both founded the independent theatre group Grupo La Tea (Torch Group) and staged in 2004 Arroyo's La tea fulgurante: Juan Santamaría o las iras de un dios (The Blazing Torch: Juan Santamaría or the Wrath of a God) in order to encourage high school students in learning history as well as having a first appealing approach to professional theatre. This play, that retells the story of Costa Rica's national hero Juan Santamaría, gained him another Aquileo J. Echeverría National Prize and features as one of the Ministry of Education’s official mandatory reading in all Costa Rican high schools. It has been presented throughout the country's provinces and it is still in repertoire. The group's labor was recognized in 2009 with the National Award for Best Theatrical Group given by the Ministry of Culture.

Another project by Grupo La Tea and written also by Arroyo is Costa Rica: formación de una nación (Costa Rica: The Building of a Nation), a theatrical tour presented in the exhibition halls of Costa Rica's National Museum. This is one more of his didactic plays and focuses on the historic events of 19th century Costa Rica. The play had three consecutive season (2008, 2009 and 2010) thanks to the support of Banco Nacional de Costa Rica. This project received an Honorific Mention in the I Premio Educacion y Museos (I Education and Museums Award) given by the international network Ibermuseos in Madrid 2010.

In 2008 Grupo La Tea premiered his play La Romería (The Pilgrimage), that tells the story of a cancer patient and an AIDS victim's journey to a holy sanctuary. This dramatic piece earned him the Aquileo J. Echeverria National Award of that year, making him the only author to receive four times this award for theatrical works.

In 2006–2007 and 2011–2012 he served as Director of Alajuela's Municipal Theater. During his terms that playhouse has had its most prominent activities. There he directed the revival of his L'ánima sola de Chico Muñoz (The Forlorn Soul of Chico Muñoz) that again broke attendance records. He also wrote Retablo Navideño (A Christmas Tableau) for the holiday festivities. His administration of the theater also included tours of other productions companies that enriched the Alajuelan artistic scene of the time.

He has also written his first novel Félix el puma y la gran carrera (Felix the Puma and the Great Race). A teen novel published by Alfaguara in 2012. Set in the tropical dry forest, the novel tells the adventures of the young puma Felix and his desire to win the renowned seashell cup of the forest with his other feline friends and the rest of the forest's fauna.

In 2014 he wrote the play Al compas de la carreta (To the Beat of the Wagon) that was premiered in the festivities of the biggest and oldest oxcart parade in the country in Escazu. This is a family oriented play about ox-herding and oxcart traditions of Costa Rica, an intrinsic part of Costa Rican identity that has been added to UNESCO Intangible Cultural Heritage Lists . That same year he wrote and directed the first theatrical guided tour to CENAC Centro Nacional de Cultural (National Center of Culture) De fábrica de licores a factoría cultural (From Licor Factory to Cultural Factory). The tour ran from June to December of that year and attracted numerous viewers with its unique way of combining historical facts with theatrical entertainment.

His play Mata-Hari: Sentencia para una aurora (Mata Hari: A Dawn’s Sentence) was published in a trilingual edition (Spanish, English, Portuguese) by the National Technical University Press (UTN) in Alajuela in 2014. This is considered a unique publication in Costa Rica. The president of the country participated in the book presentation in early 2015. There Jorge Arroyo delivered a speech where he enunciated his ten principles of scriptural faith – a personal artistic manifesto – a memorable speech that has passed into history where he publicly shares his rigorous beliefs related to writing and publishing.

Currently, Jorge Arroyo has been appointed as Costa Rica's ambassador to UNESCO and will be heading to Paris 2015 to assume this important office.

== Plays ==
- L'ánima sola de Chico Muñoz (1979)
- La chupeta electrónica (1986)
- Ayer, cuando me decías que me querías (1986)
- Con la honra en el alambre (1987)
- Mata Hari: sentencia para una aurora (1987)
- Fantasma por error (1989)
- La aventura del café (1990)
- La Batalla de Rivas (1994)
- La entrada de Jesús en Jerusalén (1995)
- Albores (1997)
- Leyendas (1997)
- Azul Marlene (1997)
- La tertulia de los espantos (1997)
- El surco entre la flor y el labio (1997)
- Trío (2000)
- Valentino, la soledad del halcón (2002)
- La patria primera -hombres de fecunda labor- (2002)
- Figueroa: notario de la patria inédita (2003)
- La Tea fulgurante: Juan Santamaría o las iras de un dios (2004)
- Costa Rica: formación de una nación (2008)
- La Romería (2008)
- Retablo Navideño (2011)
- La ruta (2012)
- Al compás de la carreta (2014)
- De fábrica de licores a factoría cultural (2014)

== Awards ==
- Premio Nacional de Teatro Eugenio Arias (1982).
- Premio Joven Creación (1983), de la Asociación Nacional de Autores.
- Premio UNA Palabra (1984), de la Universidad Nacional de Costa Rica.
- Premio Alajuelense del Año en Literatura (1995).
- Premio Nacional de Teatro Aquileo J. Echeverría (1996).
- Premio Anita Villalaz de Panamá (2002).
- Premio Nacional de Teatro Aquileo J. Echeverría (2003).
- Premio Nacional de Teatro Aquileo J. Echeverría (2004).
- Premio Nacional de Teatro Aquileo J. Echeverría (2008).
- Premio Nacional de Teatro por mejor Grupo Teatral (2009).
- Honorable Mention in the I Education and Museums Award of the international network Ibermuseos, Madrid, Spain, (2010).
- Honorable Mention in the III Award of Children’s Narrative Spanish Embassy / Alfaguara, (2011).

== Books ==
- Para aprisionar nostalgias. San José: Editorial Costa Rica, 1984.
- Cuerpo de mimbre. Heredia: Editorial Universidad Nacional (EUNA), 1985.
- Mata Hari: sentencia para una aurora. San José: Editorial del Teatro Nacional de Costa Rica, 1991.
- Azul Marlene. San José: Editorial del Teatro Nacional de Costa Rica, 1997.
- Dos obras y una más. San José: Editorial Costa Rica, 2000.
- La patria primera -hombres de fecunda labor- San José: ICAR, 2002.
- La tea fulgurante: Juan Santamaría o las iras de un dios. Alajuela: Editorial del Museo Histórico Cultural Juan Santamaría, 2005.
- La tea fulgurante: Juan Santamaría o las iras de un dios. San José: Editorial Costa Rica, 2006.
- Figueroa: notario de la patria inédita. San José: Editorial de la Universidad Estatal a Distancia (EUNED), 2006.
- La Romería. San José: Editorial de la Universidad Estatal a Distancia (EUNED), 2009.
- Félix el puma y la gran carrera San Jose: Alfaguara, 2012.
- Trío San Jose: Litho Offset Graphic, 2012.
- La tea fulgurante: Juan Santamaría o las iras de un dios San Jose: Jadine Editorial, 2013.
- Mata-Hari: Sentencia para una aurora (Mata Hari: A Dawn’s Sentence). Trilingual edition (Spanish, English, Portuguese) Alajuela: Editorial de la Universidad Tecnica Nacioal (EUTN), 2014.
