= Laureano Albán =

Costa Rican writer (1942–2022)

Laureano Albán Rivas
- Born: January 9, 1942; Turrialba, Costa Rica
- Died: June 5, 2022 (aged 80)
- Education: University of Costa Rica
- Occupations: Writer, poet, diplomat
- Writing career
- Language: Spanish
- Genres: Poetry, essays
- Notable works: Herencia del otoño (1980); Geografía invisible de América (1981); Biografías del terror (1984); Enciclopedia de las maravillas
- Notable awards: Premio Nacional de Cultura Magón (2006); Adonáis Prize (1979); Aquileo J. Echeverría National Prize
- Literary movement: Transcendentalism (Costa Rican literary movement)

Laureano Albán Rivas (9 January 1942 – 5 June 2022) was a Costa Rican writer. A native of Turrialba, he was a recipient of the Magón National Prize for Culture in 2006. He served as representative of the Republic of Costa Rica to UNESCO from 1998–2002.

== Early life and education ==
Albán was born in Turrialba, Costa Rica, in 1942 and studied philology and linguistics at the University of Costa Rica before completing doctoral studies in New York. During his youth, he became associated with poet Jorge Debravo, with whom he co-founded the Círculo de Poetas de Turrialba, later reorganised in the 1960s as the Círculo de Poetas Costarricenses. This group played an important role in shaping literary activity in Costa Rica and influenced subsequent generations of writers.

== Literary career ==
In 1977, Albán and several contemporaries, including Julieta Dobles, Ronald Bonilla, and Carlos Francisco Monge, issued the Transcendentalist Manifesto, which laid the foundations for a literary movement that sought to renew poetic language and move beyond established rhetorical traditions. The movement generated debate within Costa Rica and later extended beyond the country, including initiatives in Spain. Albán’s work often explored sociopolitical and existential themes and aimed to awaken a sense of transcendental awareness in the reader.

He published numerous works of poetry and essays beginning in the 1960s, with major titles including Herencia del otoño (1980), Geografía invisible de América (1981), and Biografías del terror (1984). His writing drew on mythological and historical themes of the Americas and addressed issues such as cultural identity, memory, and political repression. Over the course of his career, he produced a substantial body of work, including the multi-volume poetic project Enciclopedia de las maravillas.

== Diplomatic and academic career ==
Alongside his literary activity, Albán pursued a diplomatic career. He served in various international roles, including as ambassador to the United Nations in New York, to Israel, and as a representative to UNESCO. He also held academic positions, including teaching literary theory and creative writing at the University of Costa Rica between 1990 and 1998.

== Awards and recognition ==
Albán received numerous literary awards, including the Adonáis Prize and the Costa Rican National Aquileo J. Echeverría Prize, and was widely published internationally, particularly in Spain. In 2006, he was awarded the Premio Nacional de Cultura Magón, the highest cultural distinction in Costa Rica, in recognition of his poetic achievements and international influence.

=== List of awards ===
- Adonais Prize for poetry, Madrid, Spain, 1979.
- National Poetry Prize Achilles J. Echeverria, San Jose, Costa Rica, 1980.
- First Prize of Spanish Culture, Madrid, Spain, 1981.
- Spanish American Literature Award, Huelva, Spain, 1982.
- Religious International Poetry Prize, Burgos, Spain, 1983.
- Single Award VII Biennial of Poetry, León, Spain, 1983.
- Columbia University Translation Award center, New York, USA. UU., 1983.
- Prize Walt Whitman Poetry Central, Central, 1986.
- World Prize for Mystical Poetry Rielo Fernando, Madrid, Spain, 1989.
- National Poetry Prize Achilles J. Echeverria, San Jose, Costa Rica, 1993.
- Mago National Culture Award, San José, Costa Rica, 2006.

== Death and legacy ==
Albán died on 5 June 2022 following health complications.

His death was noted in Costa Rican cultural circles, where he was regarded as a central figure in the development of modern poetry in the country. In 2023, the National Library of Costa Rica organised a commemorative exhibition dedicated to his life and work, highlighting his influence on literature and younger generations of writers.
