= Carlos Aguilar Piedra =

Costa Rican archaeologist

Carlos Aguilar Piedra (August 24, 1917 – March 31, 2008) was a prominent Costa Rican archaeologist on the faculty of the University of Costa Rica. He is often referred to as "the grandfather of Costa Rican archaeology" for his significant work at Guayabo de Turrialba and other sites in the Central Highlands region of that country.

== Early life ==
Aguilar was born in canton of Guarco, near Cartago, Costa Rica, where he lived until his death at the age of 90. Aguilar worked at the Department of Natural History at the Museo Nacional de Costa Rica in 1942.

== Education ==
In 1958, Aguilar was the first person to receive a Master's degree in anthropology from the National Autonomous University of Mexico. He spent some time as a graduate student at the University of Kansas, where he undertook fieldwork with archaeologist Albert Spaulding. In 1962, Aguilar joined the faculty of the University of Costa Rica, where he was one of the founders of the Department of Anthropology and also helped with the creation of the Laboratory of Archaeology.

== Contributions to Archaeology ==
In 1946, he published one of the first studies of Pre-Columbian gold in Mexico.

In 1952, he published a brief study of complex trophy heads in the Costa Rican iconography.

In 1969, Aguilar published an article about the ballgame in Greater Nicoya.

In the early 1970s, Carlos started archaeological fieldwork at Guayabo de Turrialba, a large archaeological site representing the remains of a Pre-Columbian village. He also wrote about the collection of indigenous gold objects at the Pre-Columbian Gold Museum in San José. He contributed to the study of cultural sequences in the Central Area of Costa Rica. In 1974, he published research on zoomorphic monoliths at Guayabo de Turrialba and began fieldwork at the site of El Monito. He published two articles about his research on the archaeology of the Arenal Volcano Area; one in 1977 in National Geographic Society Research Reports over Tephrastratigraphy and Cultural Sequences and one in 1984 in Annals of the Academy of Geography and History of Costa Rica.

The Americanist anthropology today published his article over his research on the early presence of copper in the Central Intermontano of Costa Rica in 1980 and in 1981, the Preservation Press published an article over his research on two case studies of archaeological parks: Guayabo de Turrialba in Costa Rica and El Caño in Coclé, Panama.

His most important contribution is his research at Guayabo, which is now the Guayabo National Monument. Guayabo was discovered in 1968 by Carlos and is the largest and most important archaeological site in Costa Rica. In 1973, Aguilar played a key role in having Guayabo declared as a national monument.

== Other interests ==
Aguilar also taught literature and language, and was a craftsman.

=== Awards ===
In 1966 Aguilar won the Cleto González Víquez Prize for Religion and Magic of the Indians of Southern Origin of Costa Rica.

In 1972, Aguilar won the National Scientific Essay Achilles J. Echeverria Award.

Most importantly, Aguilar won the Magón Prize in 2004.
