= Militant Workers Revolutionary Party =

Militant Workers Revolutionary Party (Spanish: Partido Revolucionario de los Trabajadores en Lucha) was a political party in Costa Rica. In 1990 the party contested the general elections. However, its presidential candidate, Edwin Badilla, received only 1,005 (0.1%) of the votes, whilst the party received just 742 votes in the parliamentary election.
