= Catalina Murillo =

Costa Rican author and screenwriter

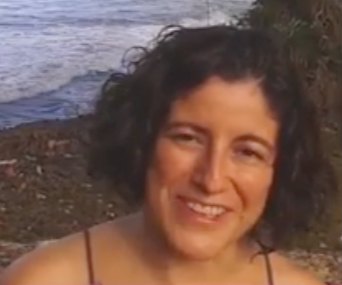
- In a video for Centroamérica cuenta 2016
- Born: Catalina Murillo Valverde; 6 June 1970 (age 55); San José, Costa Rica
- Education: EICTV; University of Costa Rica
- Occupation: Writer
- Notable work: Maybe Managua
- Awards: Aquileo J. Echeverría National Prize (2018)

Catalina Murillo Valverde (born 6 June 1970) is a Costa Rican author and screenwriter, winner of the Aquileo J. Echeverría National Prize in 2018 for her novel Maybe Managua, and in 2025 for her novel An Insignificant Woman.

== Biography ==
Catalina Murillo Valverde was born in a taxi in San José on 6 June 1970.

She attended college at the Liceo Franco Costarricense. She studied collective communication sciences at the University of Costa Rica and screenwriting at the Escuela Internacional de Cine y Televisión (EICTV) in San Antonio de los Baños, Cuba. She worked as a screenwriter on the Costa Rican television series El barrio and La pensión.

At age 28 she emigrated to Madrid, Spain. She lived there for a decade, working as a film and television screenwriter, and as an analyst and screenwriting tutor. She has been a juror and script reader for contests and festivals such as Oaxaca Sundance, Ibermedia, the Costa Rica International Book Fair, and the Guadalajara International Book Fair. She was a juror at the 2018 San José shnit international shortfilmfestival.

She has published Largo Domingo Cubano (1995), Marzo todopoderoso (2003), Corredoiras y Largo Domingo Cubano (2017), and Tiembla, Memoria (2017). In 2018, she published Maybe Managua through Uruk Editores, for which she received the Aquileo J. Echeverría National Prize for best novel, shared with the work Mierda by Carla Pravisani. Her most recent novel is An Insignificant Woman (2024), for which she received the Aquileo J. Echeverría National Prize for best novel in 2025.

She is currently a script consultant and teacher at Fuentetaja Workshops, as well as a thesis tutor at the International University of La Rioja (UNIR).
