= Larissa Rú =

Costa Rican writer

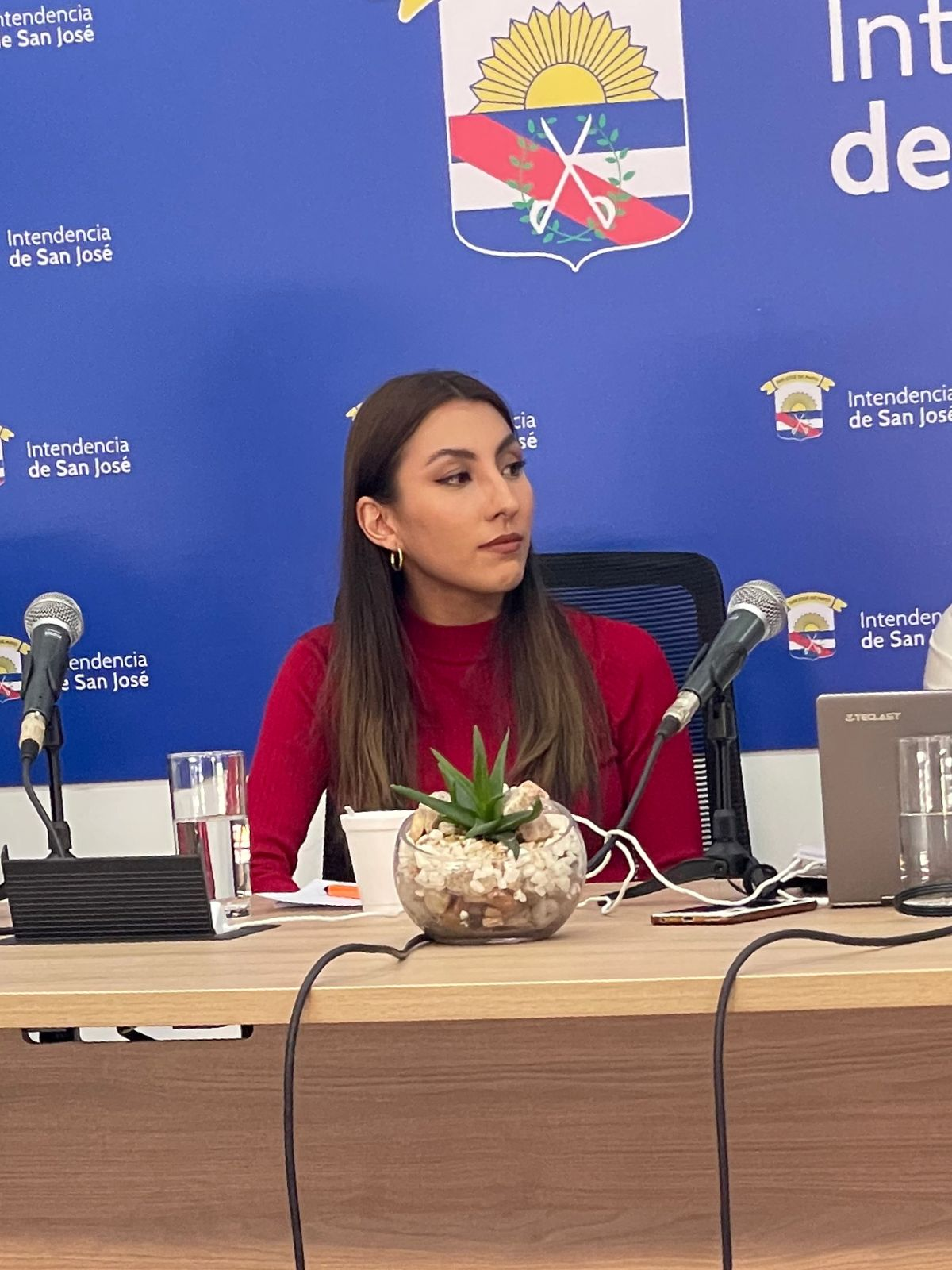
- Larissa Rú in 2022
- Born: Larissa Quesada Arroyo; 1998 (age 27–28); San José, Costa Rica
- Education: Universidad de Costa Rica
- Writing career
- Notable works: Cómo sobrevivir a una tormenta extranjera (2020), Monstruos bajo la lluvia (2022)
- Notable awards: Aquileo J. Echeverría National Prize for Best Novel; 2020; Aquileo J. Echeverría National Prize for Best Story; 2022

Larissa Quesada Arroyo (born 1998), known by her pen name Larissa Rú, is a Costa Rican writer of speculative fiction, horror, and fantasy. She is a two-time winner of the Aquileo J. Echeverría National Prize: for best novel (2020) and best story (2022).

== Biography ==
Larissa Quesada Arroyo, known as Larissa Rú, was born in San José, Costa Rica, in 1998. She studied art history at the University of Costa Rica. She also pursued additional studies in cultural heritage at Ca' Foscari University of Venice.

Rú is known as a writer of speculative fiction, horror, and fantasy. While still a student at the University of Costa Rica, in 2020, she published her first novel, Cómo sobrevivir a una tormenta extranjera. This work won the Aquileo J. Echeverría National Prize, the highest cultural honor in Costa Rica, for best novel of that year. Rú had begun writing the novel at 17 years old while traveling abroad and feeling a sense of vulnerability and loneliness due to not fitting in. It deals with a young Venezuelan immigrant who, while suffering a pulmonary illness, is sent to Europe under false pretenses.

In 2021, she published her second novel, Plenilunio, a work of young adult fantasy. Her first collection of horror short stories, Monstruos bajo la lluvia, followed in 2022. Its eight stories use the horror genre to explore women's lives, fears, and relationships. That collection won the Aquileo J. Echeverría National Prize for short stories.

Since 2024, Rú has worked as an editor at the Costa Rican literary publisher Encino Ediciones.
