= Amalia Chaverri Fonseca =

Costa Rican linguist (born 1941)

Amalia Chaverri Fonseca (born 1941) is a Costa Rican philologist and expert in Latin American literature, member of the Costa Rican Academy of Language since 2006. She previously served as director of the Costa Rican Museum of Art.

== Career ==
Chaverri was born in 1941 in San José, Costa Rica. She graduated with a degree in Literature from the University of Costa Rica, where she also obtained a master's degree.

She has taught Latin American literature at the University of Costa Rica, and her studies on Latin American literature have been published in national and international academic journals. She joined the academic council of the Centre for Research on Central American Culture and Identity. Chavarria has contributed to Costa Rican newspapers on culture, politics and education.

Chaverri was director of the Costa Rican Museum of Art and between 2002 and 2006 she was Deputy Minister of Culture. During this period, she coordinated the commemorative edition El Quijote entre nosotros (Don Quixote Among Us) and succeeded in getting UNESCO to declare Costa Rican boyeo and painted carts as intangible cultural heritage.

On 6 April 2006, Chaverri took office as a member of the Costa Rican Academy of Language, occupying Seat B, with her speech Literature: a web of fictions.

== Publications ==
- Chaverri Fonseca, A. (2021). El año de la ira: Ensayo sobre un crimen Nueva novela histórica/arqueológica de América Latina. Revista Estudios. https://doi.org/10.15517/re.v0i0.46030
- Chaverri Fonseca, A. (2017). Algunas reflexiones sobre crítica teatral. ESCENA. Revista De Las Artes, 26–30. https://doi.org/10.15517/es.v0i0.29307
