= Universidad Nacional, School for International Relations =

The School for International Relations of the Universidad Nacional was born as a proposal of Father Dr. Benjamín Núñez, founder and first rector of the university.

The school for International Relations is nowadays one of the leading institutes in the study of international affairs in Costa Rica and in Central America.
