= Anacristina Rossi =

Costa Rican writer

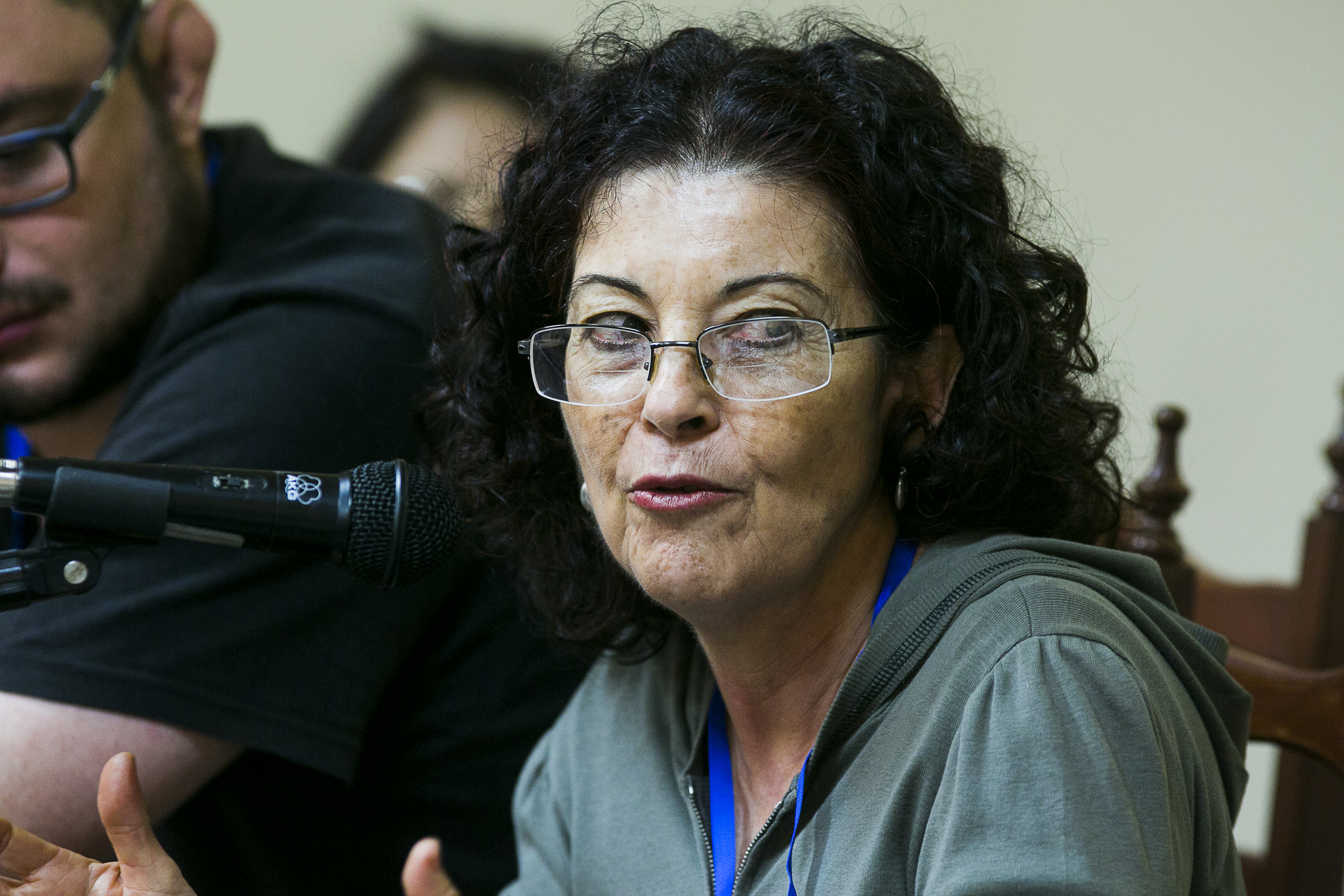
Anacristina Rossi in 2015

Anacristina Rossi (born December 25, 1952 in San José, Costa Rica) is a Costa Rican writer.

== Biography ==
After studying theatre and dance in her home country, she travelled to Europe and studied in England, France and the Netherlands. She has a diploma in translation from the University of Paris and a master's degree in women studies and development from the International Institute of Social Studies.

Rossi marks the change of century in Costa Rican literature with the novel María la noche. Possessor of an intimate narrative, many times provocative, does not hesitate to discuss subjects of social transcendence by means of the complaint. The author has noted as influences Virginia Woolf, Henry Miller, Julio Cortázar, Marguerite Duras and Anaïs Nin.

Rossi has also been a columnist and activist in environmental subjects. Her work has been translated to Italian, French and English, and many of her tales are part of anthologies and magazines in Central America, France, Spain, the United Kingdom and the United States.

Currently she works as a professor at the University of Costa Rica.

== Works ==
=== Novels ===
- María la noche, Lumen, Barcelona, Spain, 1985. Novel translated to French and published in Actes Sud Editorial in 1997 under the title of Maria la nuit.
- La Loca de Gandoca, EDUCA (Editorial Universitaria Centroamericana), San José (Costa Rica), 1991. About the early efforts to establish the now known as Jairo Mora Sandoval Gandoca-Manzanillo Mixed Wildlife Refuge protected area. This work was later published by Editorial Legado, and published in English in unauthorized form. It has been adapted to theatre and dance.
- Limón Blues, Alfaguara, San José, Costa Rica, 2002/2003.
- Limón Reggae, Editorial Legado, 2007. Second part of the trilogy started with Limón Blues.

=== Short stories ===
- Situaciones Conyugales, Editorial REI, San José, Costa Rica, 1993.

=== Essays ===
- "Essay on violence", Editorial Uruk, San José, 2007.
- "El corazón del desarraigo: la primera literatura afrocostarricense", Historia de las literaturas, Editorial F&G, Guatemala, 2010.
- "Change of economic system: a matter of survival", Magazine of Social Sciences of the University of Costa Rica.

== Awards and honours ==
- National prize of Novel Aquileo Echeverría<meta /> in 1985 by María la noche.
- Special guest of the Ministry of Culture of France to join the program Belles Etrangères in 1997.
- Prize Ancora of Literature in the 2002.
- National prize of Novel Aquileo Echeverría in 2002 by Limón Blues.
- Presidential medal of the Birth of Pablo Neruda, awarded by the Government of Chile in the 2004.
- Latin American prize of Narrative José María Arguedas, awarded by the House of the Américas in 2004.
- Member of number of the Academia Costarricense de la Lengua (the author quit to said place in 2009)
