= León Pacheco Solano =

Costa Rican writer (1898–1980)

León Pacheco Solano (May 9, 1898, in Tres Ríos, Cartago – July 26, 1980, in San José) was a Costa Rican writer and journalist who belonged to the so-called "Generación de los 40." He was a recipient of the Magón National Prize for Culture in 1972.

== Biography ==
After finishing high school, he published his first three books: "Meditaciones al margen de motivos de Proteo", "Ensayo sobre el poeta Rafael Cardona, su personalidad", and "Filosofía de la crítica: Moisés Vincenzi, su personalidad" . He traveled to Paris in 1919. At this time, when he started to use the name León because the French showed little appreciation for his first name. While studying in La Sorbona, he came into contact with Miguel Ángel Asturias, Arturo Uslar Pietri, and Alfonso Reyes.

In 1932, he returned to Costa Rica as a high school French, Castilian, Literature, and esthetics professor, and later at the University of Costa Rica. He worked as an opinion and literary journalist, collaborating for newspapers and magazines such as Buenos Aires' La Razón, Caracas' El Universal, Bogotá's El Tiempo, Mexico's Novedades, Madrid's ABC, Paris' Revue de L’Amérique Latine, and the Repertorio Americano.

Even though he wrote a novel for the "generación del 40" (Los pantanos de infierno, which was about the banana strike of 1934), his main interest as a writer was in essay writing. From his studies of the French Culture he wrote Once maestros franceses (1936) and El hilo de Ariadna (1965). Tres ensayos apasionados: Vallejo, Unamuno, Camus (1968) and Puertas abiertas, puertas afuera (1976) were written about politics, style, and the Costa Rican identity. In 1972 he was awarded the Magón National Prize for Culture.
