= Isabel Campabadal =

Costa Rican culinary professional

- Born: 1943 or 1944 (age 81–82); Costa Rica
- Awards: 2019 Magón Prize

Isabel Campabadal is a Costa Rican chef, author, and cooking teacher. In 2019 Costa Rica awarded her the Magón Prize, the country's highest civilian recognition.

== Early life and education ==
Camabadal was born to Anabel González.

Campabadal became interested in cooking at an early age, which she attributes to her mother's influence. She studied at Le Cordon Bleu, LaVarenne École de Cuisine, École de Trois Gourmandes, and École de Cuisine Ritz Escoffier. She also studied with Marcella Hazan.

== Career ==
Campabadal's work focusses on researching, writing and teaching about Costa Rican cuisine. Her work is considered to have created a modern Costa Rican cuisine that dignifies and builds on the country's traditional cuisine. She began teaching in 1974 and has taught classes on an international level.

Campabadal has written 19 books.

== Recognition ==
Costa Rica awarded her the 2019 Magón Prize, its highest civilian recognition and the first ever given to a culinary professional, for her contributions to the country's culinary heritage. In 2023 the Amura Culinary Center recognized her with a mural. According to Matador Network, Campabadal is "considered the creator of modern Costa Rican cuisine".

== Personal life ==
Campabadal married at 18.
