= Julieta Schildknecht =

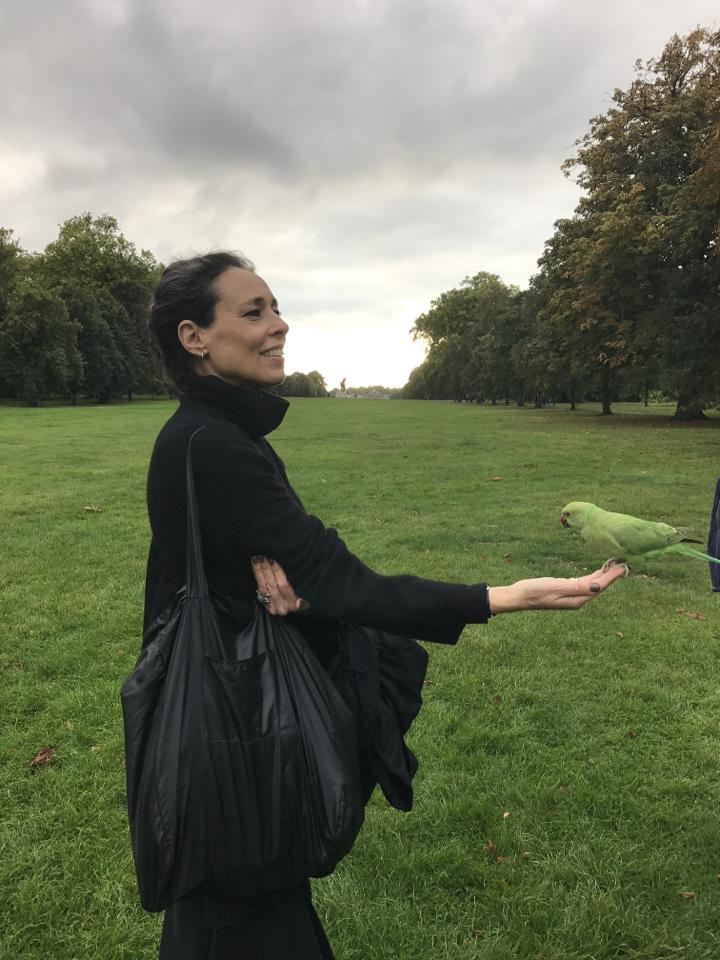
- Julietta Schildknecht in 2017
- Born: Julieta Schildknecht; April 7, 1960 (age 65); São Paulo, Brazil
- Known for: Photography
- Notable work: equus, blera maila, solitude, iracema, activism, de profundis, shakti, sky plantation, aufdemwegzumschloss

Julieta Schildknecht (born April 7, 1960, in São Paulo) is a Swiss-Brazilian photographer and journalist.

== Biography ==
Schildknecht grew up in São Paulo. She completed a law degree at the Catholic University of Rio de Janeiro, then started working in the advertising industry for a few years. During a three-year stay in New York, she went for one year at the Parsons School of Design and worked in the fashion industry, being associated to Liz Clayborne and Fiorucci in São Paulo. She later moved to Switzerland and has worked for three and a half years in private banking at UBS in Zürich.

Since 2001, Schildknecht is a freelance photographer. In 2002 she began working with Keystone picture agency in Zürich and in 2005 she was aggregated to Agência O Estado de São Paulo photo agency. In 2007 she attended the Visual Culture Studies with Katharina Sieverding at the International Summer Academy of Fine Arts in Salzburg. In 2009 she became a member of SIK-ISEA and ProLitteris, before enrolling at the University of Zürich to study History of Art and Photography. In 2013 she was awarded a Master of Arts with Merit from Oxford Brookes University in the UK.

Schildknecht has had several solo and group exhibitions in Switzerland, Brazil, New York, London and Brussels. Her work is part of private and institutional collections, including Thomas Koerfer, Museum Tinguely in Basel, and the World Meteorological Organization in Geneva among others. Over the years, she has received a series of grants from Terre des Hommes child relief agency, Volkart Stiftung in Winterthur, ECPAT national agency for child protection in Switzerland, Don Bosco Mondo youth aid in Latin America, Syngenta, Cape Capital, UBS Culture Foundation, Regula Curti of Beyond Foundation in Switzerland, and Mauro Salles. In 2016, Schildknecht has initiated Polka Dots Editions – an editorial and publishing platform that publishes her work and the work of selected photographers.

== Works ==
=== Solo exhibitions ===
- 2001: Very Good People, Andy Jllien Gallery, Zurich
- 2001: Gabrieles Hochzeit, Hotel Seehof, Zurich, and Suvretta House, St. Moritz
- 2002: Expo.02, "Oui“ Pavillon, Yverdon (Switzerland).
- 2004: Auf dem weg zum schloss, Schloss Tarasp (Switzerland)
- 2004: Skyplantation, SWX, Zurich, and World Meteorological Organisation, Genf
- 2005: Fairy Kind, Interkantonale Hochschule für Heilpädagogik, Zurich
- 2007: De profundis, Tynguely Museum, Basel
- 2008: De profundis, Galerie Foto-Forum, Bozen (Italy)
- 2009: Auf dem weg zum schloss, Bahnhof Ardez & Skulpturenweg Sur En, Sent (Switzerland)
- 2013: equus, as part of photo-project, The Piper Gallery, London (UK)
- 2015: moving images of one same frame, Megan Piper, Private space, London (UK)
- 2016: Stone Valley, The Embassy of Brazil, London (UK)
- 2016: After Howl, Galerie am Lindenhof, Zurich (Switzerland)
- 2016: Stone Valley, The Embassy of Brazil, Brussels (Belgium)
- 2017: Selected Works, Zebra One Gallery, London (UK)
- 2017/2018: The Fisherman, London Review Bookshop, London (UK)
