= Tatiana Lobo =

Costa Rican author (1939–2023)

Tatiana Lobo Wiehoff
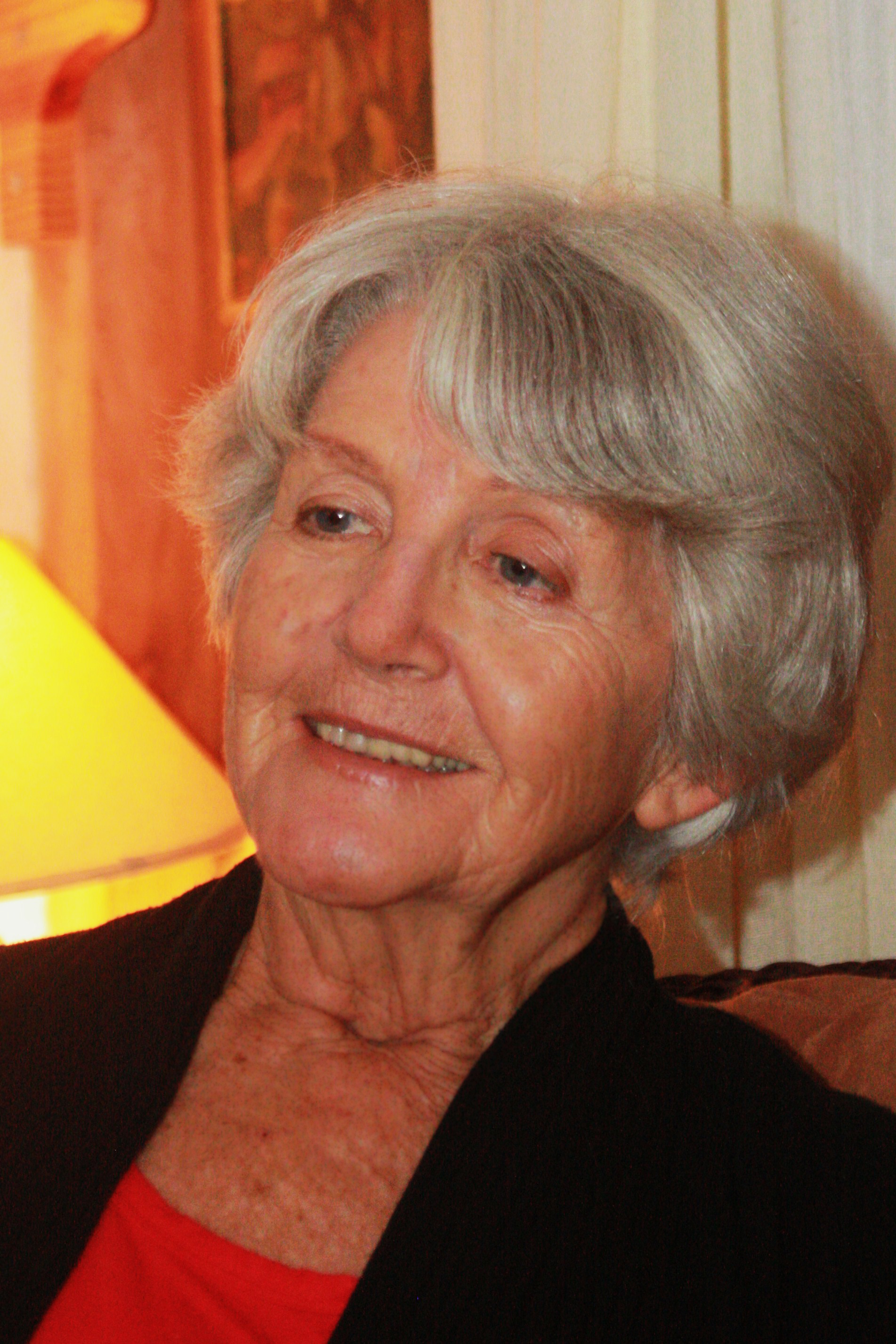
- Lobo in 2013
- Born: Tatiana Lobo Wiehoff; 13 November 1939; Puerto Montt, Chile
- Died: 22 February 2023 (aged 83); Costa Rica
- Occupation: Author
- Awards: Sor Juana Inés de la Cruz Prize (1995); Aquileo J. Echeverría National Prize; Premio Academia Costarricense de la Lengua

Tatiana Lobo Wiehoff (13 November 1939 – 22 February 2023) was a Chilean and Costa Rican author.

Lobo was born in Puerto Montt, Chile on 13 November 1939. She moved to Costa Rica in 1963 and remained there for the rest of her life. Her published works have crossed over several genres, including novels, plays, short stories and articles. She has received several awards for her fiction, including the Sor Juana Inés de la Cruz Prize in 1995, Costa Rica's Aquileo J. Echeverría National Prize, and the Costa Rican Premio Academia Costarricense de la lengua. Her works have been translated into French, German, and English.

In her final years, Lobo secluded herself at her home in San Ramón, although she continued making social media posts about local and international politics. Her final postings, in which she criticized Daniel Ortega and the Nicaraguan government's decision to strip the citizenship of 222 dissidents, were made four days before her death.

Lobo died on 22 February 2023, at the age of 83.

== Bibliography ==
- Tiempo de claveles (short stories, 1989) ISBN 978-9977-23-511-0
- El caballero del V Centenario (play, 1989)
- Asalto al paraíso (novel, 1992) ISBN 978-9977-67-204-5 (translated by Asa Zatz as Assault on Paradise)
- Entre Dios y el Diablo, mujeres de la Colonia (short stories, 1993), ISBN 978-9977-67-249-6
- Calypso (novel, 1996) ISBN 978-9977-986-87-6
- El año del laberinto (novel, 2000) ISBN 978-9968-15-084-2
- Parientes en venta: la esclavitud en la Colonia (history, 2010) ISBN 978-9977-952-95-6
- Candelaria del Azar (novel, 2010) ISBN 978-9977-952-93-2
- El Corazón del silencio (novel 2011) ISBN 978-9977-23-948-4
- El Puente de Ismael (novel, 2014) ISBN 978-9930-94-868-2
- Te deam laudeamus (te alabamos, diosa) (poetry)
