= Julieta Valero =

Spanish poet (born 1971)

- Born: 27 July 1971; Madrid, Spain
- Occupation: Poet
- Writing career
- Genre: poetry
- Notable works: Altar de los días parados, Los heridos graves, Autoría, Que concierne, Los tres primeros años, NIños aparte, Mitad

Julieta Valero (born 1971 in Madrid) is a Spanish poet who writes in Spanish.

== Biography ==
She got a BA in Hispanic philology at Complutense University of Madrid, where she also continued studying a PhD in Modern and Contemporary Spanish Literature.

She published short stories, poems and articles in several literary medias such as Ínsula, ABCD de las artes y las letras, Turia, Vulcane, Minerva, El Maquinista (de la General), Diario de Poesía (Argentina), and usually collaborates with literary magazines Encubierta, Diálogo de la lengua, Fósforo, Babab, La dama duende and the Spanish Culture ministry's magazine Literaturas.

She also took part of numerous anthologies such as: Inéditos: 11 poetas (2002), 33 de Radio 3 (2004), Todo es poesía menos la poesía. 22 poetas desde Madrid (2004), 11-M. Poemas contra el olvido (2004), Poesía pasión (2004), Deshabitados (2008), Fuga de la nada. 16 propuestas poéticas (2009), El poder del cuerpo. Antología femenina contemporánea (2009), Palabras sobre palabras: 13 poetas españoles jóvenes (Chile, 2010) and Contrabando: una antología de la poesía española actual (Argentina, 2011).

She is the author of the poetry collection Altar de los días parados (Madrid, 2003), Los Heridos Graves (Barcelone, 2005, Prize IV Premio De Poesía Radio Joven de RNE-R3) and Autoría (Barcelone, 2010, Prize XXII Premio de Poesía Cáceres Patrimonio de la Humanidad, Prize Premio Ausiás March 2010, and was elected as one of the 10 best books of the year by the magazine Quimera and one of the best books of 2010 by Babelia and El Cultural), as well as a short essay for the re-edition of Teatro de operaciones (Madrid, 2010).

She delivered numerous lectures and took part of numerous international festivals of poetry (Festival de Poesía de Medellín, Colombia, 2007; Encuentro de Poetas del Mundo Latino, Mexico, 2010). Many of their poems have been translated in the United States, in France, in Italy, in Germany, in Morocco, in Brazil, in Slovakia and in Greece.

She co-directed and presented along with Mariano Peyrou for 5 years A ras de verso (radio broadcast of the Radio Círculo, belonging to the es:Círculo de Bellas Artes of Madrid), a poetry programme in which they interview a Spanish or Latino American poet based on his texts. She belongs to the council and work as editor and poetry specialist in the creative writings centre Hotel Kafka. Since 2008 she is coordinator at the Foundation of the Poetry Centre José Hierro.

In 2011, she takes part, along with nine other Spanish poets (Jordi Doce, Rafael Reig, Fernando Aramburu, Francisco Javier Irazoki, Santiago Auserón, Pilar Adón, Javier Azpeitia, Marta Agudo and Vicente Molina Foix) to a tribute to Raymond Queneau on the occasion of the fifty years anniversary of his cult book Hundred Thousand Billion Poems publication, by creating a Spanish version called Cien mil millones de poemas, but with a sonnet they composed themselves taking a leaf out of one of the Queneau's sonnet of their choice. The edition has been made in such a way that each line is disposed on a strap that can be put up so to see the line of the next poem, making thus easier to compose each one of the hundred thousand billion poems.

== List of major works ==
=== Poetry collections ===
- Altar de los días parados. Bartleby, 2003.
- Los heridos graves. DVD, 2005.
- Autoría. DVD, 2010.
- Que concierne. Vaso roto, 2015.
- Los tres primeros años. Vaso Roto, 2019.
- Mitad. Vaso roto, 2021.

=== Participation in anthologies or collective collections ===
- Antología (Asociación Colegial de Escritores de España, 1997)
- Inéditos: 11 poetas (2002)
- 33 de Radio 3 (2004)
- Todo es poesía menos la poesía. 22 poetas desde Madrid, (2004)
- 11-M. Poemas contra el olvido (2004)
- Poesía pasión (2004)
- Deshabitados (2008)
- Por dónde camina la poesía española. In Revista Letra internacional 98. Numéro 98. 2008. Fundación Pablo Iglesias, ISSN 0213-4721
- Fuga de la nada. 16 propuestas poéticas (2009)
- El poder del cuerpo. Antología femenina contemporánea (2009)
- Palabras sobre palabras: 13 poetas españoles jóvenes (Chile, 2010)
- Contrabando: una antología de la poesía española actual (Argentina, 2011)
- Cien mil millones de poemas: homenaje a Raymond Queneau (2010)
- La nostalgia es una revuelta (with Oleñka Carrasco, 2017)

=== Essays ===
- La integración silenciosa. In Ínsula: Revista de letras y ciencias humanas, Nº 702, 2005, pages 14–15.
- A brief essay on the occasion of the re-edition of Teatro de operaciones, by Antonio Martínez Sarrión (Madrid, Bartleby, 2010)

=== Novel ===
- Niños aparte, Caballo de Troya (2021).

== Awards and prizes ==
- XVIII Premio de Poesía (Poetry prize) and the XVIII Premio de Cuentos (Tales prize) given by C.M.U. Isabel de España (1997)
- She was nominated for the prize Premio Adonáis de Poesía in 1998 and 1999
- IV Premio de Poesía Joven de Radio 3 for Los heridos graves (2005)
- XXII Premio de Poesía, Cáceres, Patrimonio de la Humanidad for Autoría (2009)
- Premio Ausiás March fir Autoría (2010)
