= Marco Tulio Aguilera Garramuño =

Marco Tulio Aguilera Garramuño (born 27 February 1949) is a Colombian novelist, critic and journalist. Born in Bogotá, he studied philosophy at the University of Valle and literature at the University of Kansas. Since then, he has lived in Costa Rica and Mexico, where he has taught at the Universidad Veracruzana.

He has published around 40 books, and has won numerous awards. His first novel, Breve historia de todas las cosas, written when he was 24 year old, was compared with Cien años de soledad. His book Cuentos para hacer el amor (1983) has been recognized as one of the best Colombian works of fiction of the 20th century. Other books include Aves del paraíso (1981), Los grandes y pequeños amores (1992), Breve Historia del todas las cosas (1979), Paraísos hostiles (1985), Mujeres amadas (1991), El juego de las seducciones (1989), Los placeres perdidos (1990), La noches de Ventura (1992), Alquimia popular (1979), etc.

His most ambitious work is a novel in seven volumes called El libro de la vida (includes: Mujeres amadas, La insaciabilidad, La hermosa vida, La pequeña maestra de violón, La sana lujuria (in print) and two still unpublished).

== Awards ==
- Premio Nacional de Cuento Santiago de Cali, 1975;
- Premio Nacional de Cuento Corto de la Revista Mexicana de Cultura, 1977;
- Premio Nacional de Cuento de la Universidad de Juarez (Durango, Mexico), 1978;
- Premio de Ciencia Ficción Bogotá una ciudad que sueña, Bogotá, 2005;
- Premio Nacional de Cuento Universidad del Cauca, 1978;
- Premio Nacional de Novela Aquileo J. Echeverría en Costa Rica, 1975;
- Premio Primera Bienal Nacional de Novela José Eustasio Rivera, 1988.
- Premio Latinoamericano de Cuento de la revista Plural y el Diario Excélsior, Mexico, 1979;
- Premio de La Palabra y el hombre, Mexico, 1979;
- Premio Nacional de Cuento Bernal Díaz del Castillo, Mexico, 1988;
- Premio Nacional de Cuento Infantil Juan de la Cabada, Mexico, 1997;
- Premio Nacional de Cuento San Luis Potosí, Mexico, 1990;
- Premio de Cuento Gabriel García Márquez, Mexico, 1998;
- Finalista de Premio de novela Alfaguara, Spain, 2009;
- Premio de Cuento Xalapa, Ciudad de las Flores, 2008.
- Resident author in Banff Centre for The Arts, Canada;
- Three times selected as eminent author by Veracruz Arts Institute;
