= Samuel Rovinski =

Costa Rican author (1931–2013)

- Born: Samuel Rovinski Gruszko; 1931; San José, Costa Rica
- Died: 31 August 2013 (aged 81–82); Costa Rica
- Occupation: Author and novelist
- Genre: Short story and essay

Samuel Rovinski Cruszco was a Costa Rican author of plays, novels, short stories, and essays.

== Early life ==
Samuel Rovinski attended primary and secondary schools in San José and obtained a degree in civil engineering from the National Autonomous University of Mexico. Rovinski founded and managed a construction company in Costa Rica. He was also a member of the Costa Rican intellectual community.

== Early works in theater ==
Rovinski authored many plays during his time.

== Plays ==
La Atlántida is a three-act play written in 1960 and recipient of honorary mention at the Juegos Florales Centroamericanos (Literary Competition of Central America) held in Guatemala in 1960. Los agitadores (The Agitators), written in 1964, earned the playwright honorary mention. Gobierno de alcoba (Bedroom Government) is a play in which Rovinski portrays how rightist and leftist dictators manipulate the people of their countries. Gobierno de alcoba was staged in 1967 at the Teatro Nacional. The play was directed by Andrés Saénz and Daniel Gallegos. A second staging of this play was presented by the grupo Israelita de Teatro (GIT). El laberinto (The Labyrinth) (1967) was staged at the Teatro Nacional in 1969 under the direction of Esteban polls, and Las fisgonas de Paso Ancho (The Snoopers of Paso Ancho) (1971) was staged that same year at the Escuela República de Haití in Paso Ancho by the Teatro Estudiantil Universitario (Student's University Theater). Rovinski's play 'El Martirio del Pastor' ('The Pastor's Martyrdom') was produced in 1988 at the Public Theater in New York.

== Final years ==
He served for several years as CEO of the National Theatre of Costa Rica and a member of the Costa Rican Language Academy. In 2007, he published the Genesis (Theater) under the seal of the Editorial Costa Rica. After establishing that, he later died on 31 August 2013.

== Legacy ==
His play Las Figonas de Paso Ancho was adapted into a TV series and a celebrity comics series, drawn by Hugo Díaz Jiménez.
