= Julieta Amaral =

Brazilian journalist (1962–2024)

- Born: October 8, 1962; Rio Grande, Rio Grande do Sul, Brazil
- Died: October 25, 2024 (aged 62); Rio Grande, Rio Grande do Sul, Brazil
- Occupation: Journalist

Julieta Amaral (October 8, 1962 – October 25, 2024) was a black Brazilian journalist from Rio Grande do Sul, the southernmost state of Brazil known for its highly white population and big immigration colonies from Germany and Italy.

== Biography and career ==
Graduated by the Catholic University of Pelotas, Amaral began her journalistic career at age 18 as revisor in the newspaper Agora and also in the newspaper Cassino do Sol, from the Cassino Beach, both from Rio Grande, her birthplace. She was also correspondent of the newspaper Correio do Povo, from Porto Alegre. In 1987, Amaral joined to RBS TV Rio Grande, where by 29 years, she was reporter, coordinator and presenter of the local edition of Jornal do Almoço, being the first black journalist to present a newscast in Rio Grande do Sul. Amaral stayed in the station until 2016, when she decided to dedicate herself to the press advisory.

== Death ==
Amaral died on October 25, 2024, at the age of 62, from complications of pancreatic cancer.
