= Julieta Dobles =

Costa Rican poet and writer

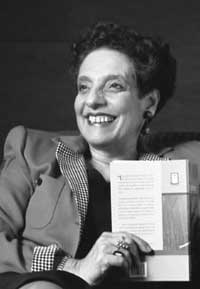
- Born: Julieta Dobles Yzaguirre; 11 March 1943 (age 83); San José, Costa Rica
- Occupations: Poet, writer, educator
- Spouse: Laureano Albán (divorced)
- Children: 5
- Writing career
- Notable works: Reloj de siempre (1965); El peso vivo (1968); Hojas furtivas (2007)

Julieta Dobles Yzaguirre (born 11 March 1943) is a Costa Rican poet, writer, and educator. She is a five-time winner of the Aquileo J. Echeverría National Prize and received the Magón National Prize for Culture in 2013.

== Biography ==
Julieta Dobles Yzaguirre was born on 11 March 1943 in San José, Costa Rica. Her mother, Ángela Yzaguirre, was a teacher and an unpublished poet. Dobles completed her studies at the University of Costa Rica, where she studied philology and linguistics. She also received a master's degree in Hispanic philology, specializing in Hispanic American literature, from Stony Brook University. Following her education, she joined the Círculo de Poetas (Circle of Poets), where she was first taught by Jorge Debravo and Laureano Albán.

In 1977, she signed the Transcendentalist Manifesto (Spanish: Manifiesto trascendentalista) alongside Laureano Albán, Carlos Francisco Monge and Ronald Bonilla.

Doble's poems and articles have been published in various journals and magazines, including the poems Reloj de siempre (1965), El peso vivo (1968), Hojas furtivas (2007). She is a professor of secondary education, as well as a professor of literature, communication, and language, at the Escuela de Estudios Generales at the University of Costa Rica. She has also coordinated various workshops on literature there. She has been a member of the Academia Costarricense de la Lengua since 2006.

== Awards ==
Dobles is a five-time winner of the Premio Nacional Aquileo J. Echeverría in Poetry (1968, 1977, 1992, 1997, and 2003). She was awarded the Premio Editorial Costa Rica in 1975 and the runners-up' prize of the Premio Adonáis de Poesía in 1981. In 2013, the Costa Rican Ministry of Culture and Youth awarded Dobles the Magón National Prize for Culture.

== Personal life ==
Dobleswas married to poet Laureano Albán from 1967 to 2001. They had five children, and worked on several books together.

== Bibliography ==
Her published works include:

- Reloj de siempre (1965)
- El peso vivo (1968)
- Los pasos terrestres (1976)
- Hora de lejanías (1982)
- Los delitos de Pandora (1987)
- Una viajera demasiado azul (1990)
- Amar en Jerusalén (1992)
- Costa Rica poema a poema (1997)
- Poemas para arrepentidos (2003)
- Las casas de la memoria (2005)
- Fuera de álbum (2005)
- Hojas furtivas (2007)
- Cartas a Camila (with Laureano Albán, 2007)
- Trampas al tiempo (2015)
- Poemas del esplendor (2016)
