= Julieta Pinto =

Costa Rican writer (1921–2022)

- Born: 31 July 1921; San Jose, Costa Rica
- Died: 22 December 2022 (aged 101)
- Education: Sorbonne
- Occupations: Professor, writer
- Known for: Director of literature and language studies at the National University of Costa Rica; Professor of Hispanic literature at University of San Ramon

Julieta Pinto (31 July 1921 – 22 December 2022) was a Costa Rican educator and writer. She was a recipient of the Aquileo J. Echeverría National Prize.

== Early life and schooling ==
Pinto was born in San José, Costa Rica, on 31 July 1921, but spent most of her youth on a farm in San Rafael de Alajuela, a time that demonstrated to her the harsh conditions of the working classes and those in lower economic levels. Her secondary schooling was at the Colegio Superior de Señoritas in San José. She then entered the Universidad de Costa Rica where she obtained a degree in philology.

After her graduation in Costa Rica, Pinto enrolled at the Sorbonne in Paris, where she studied the sociology of literature.

== Career ==
Pinto founded and became the first director of the Escuela de Literatura y Ciencias del Lenguaje (School of Literature and Language Studies) at the Universidad Nacional de Heredia. During that same time she served in several public-service areas (e.g. IMAS, PANI, ITCO, and Editorial Costa Rica), motivated solely by her desire to improve society.

Pinto served as a professor of Hispanic literature at the University of San Ramón.

== Personal life and death ==
Pinto turned 100 in July 2021, and died on 22 December 2022, at the age of 101.

== Prizes and awards ==
- Premio Nacional Aquileo J. Echeverría (novela) — 1969
- Premio Nacional Aquileo J. Echeverría (cuento) — 1970 and 1994
- Premio Nacional de Cultura Magón — 1996

The written works of Pinto tend to be philosophical in nature. Her historical novel Tata Pinto concerns the life of her ancestor Antonio Pinto.

== Bibliography ==
- Cuentos de la tierra (1963) — her first publication, a collection of short stories
- La estación que sigue al verano (1969) — Premio Aquileo J. Echeverría
- Los marginados (1970) — Premio Aquileo J. Echeverría
- David (1973) — a children's book
- A la vuelta de la esquina (1975)
- Si se oyera el silencio (1976)
- El sermón de lo cotidiano (1977)
- El eco de los pasos (1979)
- Abrir los ojos (1982)
- La lagartija de la panza color musgo (1986) — a children's book
- Entre el sol y la neblina (1986) — a novel for young readers
- Historia de Navidad (1988) — a children's book
- Tierra de espejismos (1991)
- El despertar de Lázaro (1994) — Premio Nacional de Cultura Magón (the fifth female to receive this prize)
- El lenguaje de la lluvia (1996) — Premio Aquileo J. Echeverría
- El niño que vivía en dos casas (1997)
- Tata Pinto (2005)
- The Blue Fish
- La Vieja Casona (The Old House)
- Detrás del Espejo (Behind the Mirror) (2000)
- Los Marginados
- Costa Rica: A Traveler's Literary Companion (contributor)
