= Eugenio Rodríguez Vega =

Costa Rican writer, politician, and historian (1925–2008)

Minister of Public Education
- In office 8 May 1982 – 8 May 1986
- President: Luis Alberto Monge
- Preceded by: María Eugenia Dengo
- Succeeded by: Francisco Antonio Pacheco

President of the Joint Social Welfare Institute
- In office 1974–1975
- President: Daniel Oduber Quirós
- Preceded by: Armando Alfaro Paniagua
- Succeeded by: Armando Alfaro Paniagua

Rector of the University of Costa Rica
- In office 9 December 1970 – 31 July 1974
- Preceded by: Carlos Monge Alfaro
- Succeeded by: Claudio Gutiérrez Carranza

4th Comptroller General of Costa Rica
- In office 1964–1970
- President: Francisco Orlich Bolmarcich; José Joaquín Trejos; José Figueres Ferrer
- Preceded by: Jorge Nilo Villalobos Dobles
- Succeeded by: Roberto Losilla Gamboa

Personal details
- Born: 18 August 1925 San Ramón, Costa Rica
- Died: 10 March 2008 (aged 82) Santa Ana, Costa Rica
- Party: PLN
- Spouse: Norma Oconitrillo Mata (m. 1954)
- Children: 4
- Education: University of Costa Rica
- Occupation: Lawyer; politician; historian; professor; writer
- Awards: Premio Nacional de Cultura Magón (2005)

Eugenio Rodríguez Vega (18 August 1925 – 10 March 2008) was a Costa Rican lawyer, historian and politician who served as Minister of Public Education from 1982 to 1986. A member of the National Liberation Party, he previously served as Rector of the University of Costa Rica from 1970 to 1974 and the 4th Comptroller General of Costa Rica from 1964 to 1970.

Rodríguez was a professor at the UCR from March 1960 until his retirement in May 1986, where he taught courses on sociology and history. He wrote various books on national history, and was a recipient of the Magón National Prize for Culture in 2005.

== Early life and education ==
He was born on 18 August 1925, in San Ramón, Costa Rica, to Virgilio Rodríguez and Amalia Vega. He completed his secondary education in 1943 before entering the legal profession.

== Career ==
Rodríguez Vega was involved in civic and political movements in Costa Rica during the 1940s and was a co-founder of the Social Democratic Party.

Rodríguez Vega combined a legal career with academic and public service roles. He worked as a lawyer at the Banco de Costa Rica and later joined the University of Costa Rica, where he taught sociology and held administrative positions, including subdirector of the Department of General Studies and rector from 1970 to 1974.

He also held several senior public offices, including Comptroller General of the Republic from 1964 to 1970 and Minister of Public Education from 1982 to 1986. In addition, he served as executive president of the Joint Social Welfare Institute and participated in the governance of national cultural and academic institutions.

== Academic and intellectual work ==
Rodríguez Vega was known for his contributions as a historian, essayist, and educator, focusing on the development of Costa Rican society and state institutions. His work often explored the historical evolution of political, social, and cultural structures in Costa Rica.

Among his most notable publications are Apuntes para la sociología costarricense (1953), Los días de don Ricardo (1971), and Biografía de Costa Rica (1980), as well as De Calderón a Figueres (1980) and Siete ensayos políticos (1982). He also authored later works such as Por el camino (1990), Voces del 43, and Cinco educadores en la historia, along with the memoir Cien momentos.

== Personal life ==
He was married to Norma Oconitrillo, with whom he had four children.

== Honors and recognition ==
In 2005, Rodríguez Vega was awarded the Premio Nacional de Cultura Magón, the highest cultural distinction granted by the Costa Rican state, in recognition of his lifetime contributions to the arts and intellectual life.

== Death ==
Rodríguez Vega died on 10 March 2008, at his home in Santa Ana at the age of 82.
