= Alfonso Chase =

Costa Rican author

- Born: 1944 (age 80–81); Cartago, Costa Rica
- Education: Educated in Costa Rica, Mexico, Venezuela, and the United States
- Occupation: Author
- Awards: Premio Nacional de Poesía (1967, 1995); Premio Nacional de la Novela (1968); Premio Nacional de Cuento (1975); Premio Carmen Lyra de Literatura Infantil y Juvenil (1978)

Alfonso Chase (born 1944) is a contemporary Costa Rican author.

== Biography ==
Alfonso Chase was born in Cartago, Costa Rica in 1944. He was educated in Costa Rica, Mexico, Venezuela and the United States, and he began his career in poetry in 1965. He has received numerous awards for his writing, including the Premio Nacional de Poesía twice (1967 and 1995), the Premio Nacional de la Novela (1968) and the Premio Nacional de Cuento (1975); he has also been awarded the Premio Carmen Lyra, de Literatura Infantil y Juvenil for children's literature (1978). As well as representing Costa Rica in several international committees, he founded the Department of Publications of Costa Rica's Ministry of Culture, Youth and Sports in 1970. He has worked at the Universidad Nacional in Heredia since 1974, and was named Fulbright Scholar in Residence at the University of Arkansas-Fayetteville in the United States in 1991–1992.

== Bibliography ==
- Los reinos de mi mundo (poetry, 1966)
- Arbol del tiempo (poetry, 1967)
- Los juegos furtivos (novel, 1967)
- Cuerpos (poetry, 1972)
- Las puertas de la noche (novel, 1974)
- El libro de la patria (poetry, 1975)
- Mirar con inocencia (short story, 1975)
- Los poes sobre la tierra (poetry, 1978)
- Fábula de fábulas (children's story, 1979)
- El tigre luminoso (poetry 1983)
- La pajarita de papel (children's poetry, 1985)
- Entre el ojo y la noche (poetry, 1991)
- Ella usaba bikini (short story, 1991)
- Historias del Tigre de Agua y el Colibrí de Fuego (children's story, 1992)
- El hombre que se quedó adentro del sueño (short story, 1994)
- Jardines de asfalto (poetry, 1995)
- El pavo real y la mariposa (novel, 1996)
