= Aquileo J. Echeverría =

Costa Rican writer, journalist and politician

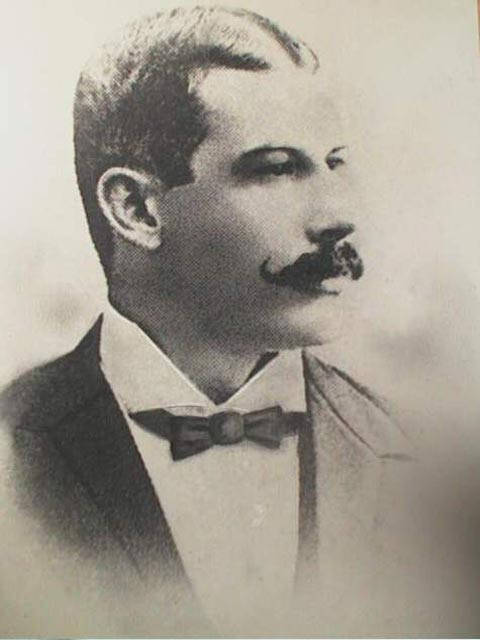
Echeverría circa 1900

Aquileo J. Echeverría (May 22, 1866 in San José, Costa Rica – March 11, 1909 in Barcelona) was a Costa Rican politician, writer, and journalist.

== Early life ==
After graduating from the National Institute, Echeverria fell on hard times. He enlisted in the military expedition against Barrios's Guatemala. After the expedition he stayed for a while in Nicaragua, forging a good relationship with President General Cárdenas. Echeverría also served in the Nicaraguan government.

== Return to Costa Rica ==
Echeverría returned to Costa Rica and became a journalist. He worked in publications like The Republic, Trade, Costa Rica Illustrated and La Patria. In 1887 he was appointed Attaché at the Embassy of Costa Rica in Washington, D.C. There he participated in the historic border agreement between Costa Rica and Nicaragua.

== Honours ==
The Premio Nacional Aquileo J. Echeverría was named for him and created by the Costa Rican Ministry of Youth, Culture and Sports (Ministerio de Cultura, Juventud y Deportes) in 1961.

== Literary work ==
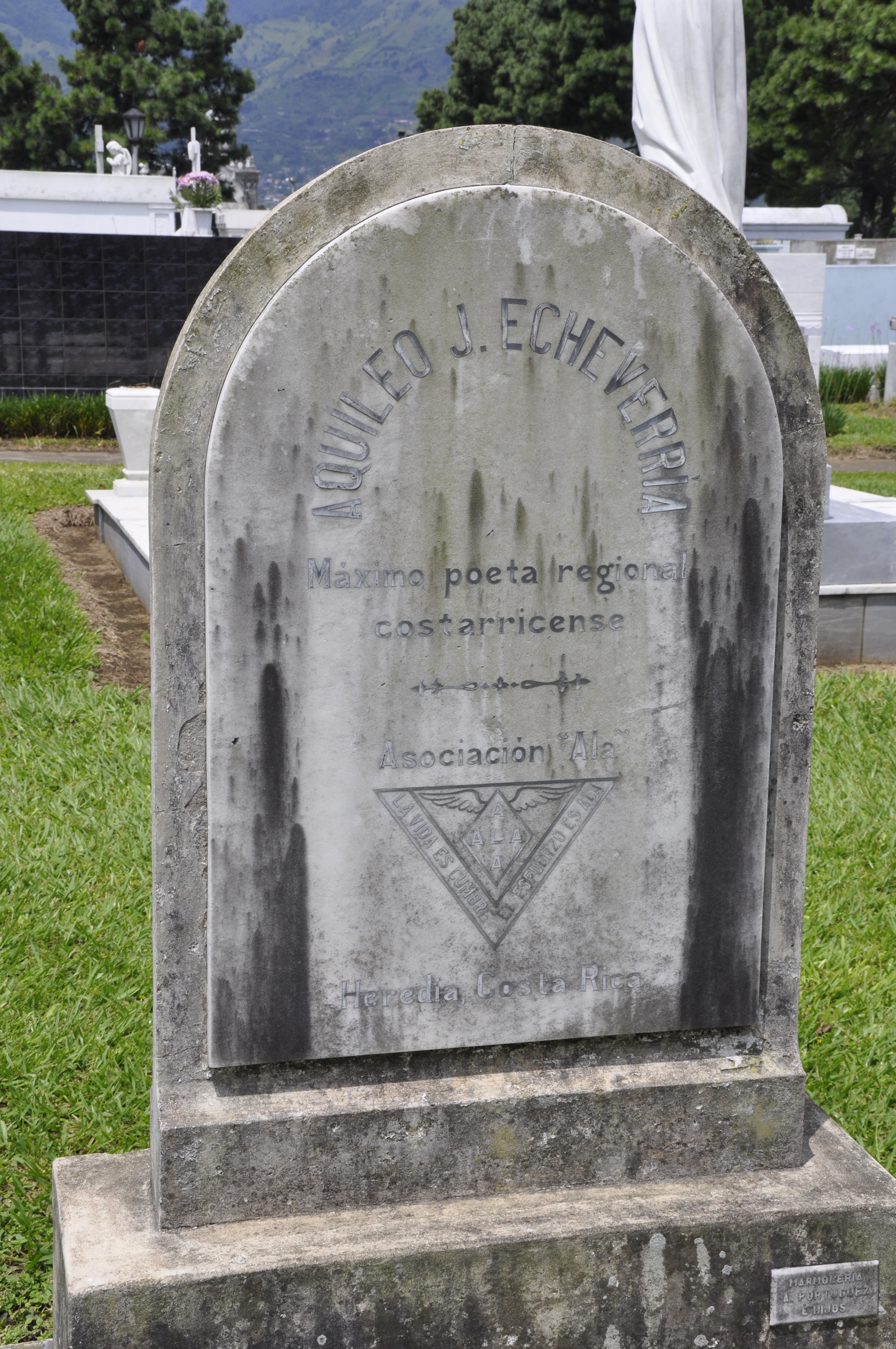
Grave of Aquileo J. Echeverria in the Cementerio General de San José, Costa Rica

- Romances (1903)
- Romances and miscellaneous
- Concherías (1905)
- Poetry, concherías and epigrams (1918)
- Chronicles and my stories (1934)
- Concherías, romances and epigrams (1950)
- Concherías, ballads, epigrams and Other Poems (1953)
