= Isaac Felipe Azofeifa =

Costa Rican poet, politician and educator

Isaac Felipe Azofeifa Bolaños
- Born: Isaac Felipe Azofeifa Bolaños; 11 April 1909; Santo Domingo de Heredia, Costa Rica
- Died: 3 April 1997 (aged 87); Costa Rica
- Education: Instituto Pedagógico de Santiago de Chile
- Occupations: Poet, educator, politician
- Known for: Costa Rican poetry; cultural and political activity
- Political party: National Liberation Party; Progress Party; Democratic Force
- Awards: National Prize of Poetry; National Culture Prize (Magón)

Isaac Felipe Azofeifa Bolaños (11 April 1909 – 3 April 1997) was a Costa Rican poet, politician and educator.

Azofeifa is considered one of the most important Costa Rican poets of the twentieth century.

== Biography ==
He was born in Santo Domingo de Heredia, Costa Rica in 1909.

In 1929 he entered the Instituto Pedagógico de Santiago de Chile (Pedagogical Institute of Santiago), where he became Professor of State in Castilian. He became a member of the Runrunismo group where he met poets such as Pablo Neruda, Juvencio Valle and Pablo de Rokha. In 1935 he returned to Costa Rica and it dedicated his life to literature, the education and politics. He won second place in a contest to write a diary of Costa Rica. From 1943 until his retirement, he was professor of Literature in the University of Costa Rica.

He spent many years reading literature, and published his first poem book, Truncates Unit in 1958. He then went on to publish Vigilia en pie de muerte (1962), Canción (1964), Estaciones (1967) and Días y territorios (1969), among others.

Azofeifa obtained important distinctions and prizes: Academic of the Language; National prize of Poetry and in 1980 the National Prize of Culture, MAGON. Azofeifa was one of the main founders of social democracy, most notably, one of the founders of the National Liberation Party. He was ambassador of Costa Rica in Chile during the Orlich administration and in the USSR, during the Monge administration. both administrations of the National Liberation Party.

In 1989, he founded the Progress Party, for which he was running for president of Costa Rica in 1990. Later he founded the Democratic Force.

He died in April 1997 at the age of 87.

== Works ==
- Trunca Unidad (1958)
- Vigilia en pie de muerte (1962)
- Canción (1964)
- Estaciones (1967)
- Días y territorios (1969)
- Cima del gozo (1974)
- Cruce de vía (1982)
- Órbita (1996)
