= National University of Costa Rica =

Coordinates: 9.99900°N 84.11150°W

- Universidad Nacional de Costa Rica
- Motto: La verdad nos hace libres
- Motto in English: The truth makes us free
- Type: Public (State)
- Affiliations: CONARE
- Rector: M.Ed Francisco González Alvarado
- Location: Heredia, Heredia Province, Costa Rica
- Campus: Urban, Multiple Campuses
- Language: Spanish

The National University of Costa Rica (in Spanish, Universidad Nacional de Costa Rica, abbreviated UNA) is one of five public universities in the Republic of Costa Rica, in Central America. The main campus is located in the city of Heredia. More than 12,000 students study in its main campus. In addition to offering a broad undergraduate curriculum, it offers 16 Master of Arts degrees. It is known for its strong programs in ecology, sociology and education.

== History ==
The National University of Costa Rica was created in 1973 in the province of Heredia. Uladislao Gámez Solano, The Minister of Public Education under the government of José Figueres Ferrer, approved the creation of the university on 15 February 1973, through law #5182. Benjamín Núñez Vargas (a Roman Catholic priest, academic and politician) was the founder and first rector of the university.

The University opened its doors on 14 March 1973, following the legacy of the Normal School of Costa Rica and the Superior Normal School.

During its developmental phase, it brought together some of the greatest minds in Latin America at the time. This phase is defined as the "Universidad Necesaria" and laid the foundation for an institution that serves the underprivileged in Costa Rica and offers access to a superior education for all.

Today, the university has diverse academic offerings and a rigorous curriculum. UNA offers more than 65 graduate and postgraduate degree programs in various fields, such as natural sciences, earth and marine sciences, education, social sciences, health sciences, philosophy, literature and arts.

=== Volcanological and Seismological Observatory of Costa Rica ===
(OVSICORI) has an international team of seismologists and volcanologists that is dedicated to research of volcanoes, earthquakes and other tectonic processes in Costa Rica, which is located in the Central America Volcanic Arc. There are many geologists who study the eruptive activity for the volcanos in the country and observe volcanic eruptions, especially Poás Volcano, which is an active 2,708-metre (8,885 ft) stratovolcano hat is located in central Costa Rica and has erupted 39 times since 1828. The event was captured from a webcam from the Volcanological and Seismological Observatory of Costa Rica (OVSICORI) captured the moment a dark cloud exploded about 1,000 feet in the air from a massive crater of the Poás Volcano. On February 25, 2014, A webcam from the Volcanological and Seismological Observatory of Costa Rica (OVSICORI) captured the moment a dark cloud exploded about 1,000 feet in the air from a massive crater of the Poás Volcano.

In 1984, the OVSICORI-A initiates the operation of a seismographic network designed to monitor seismic and volcanic activity throughout the national territory. Currently the seismographic network has a registration system analog and one digital. The latter enables online analysis of seismic signals, allowing to expedite the analysis of signals and their study using modern computerized methods.

== Campus ==
The central campus of UNA, the Omar Dengo Campus, is located in the city of Heredia, Costa Rica and contains the buildings for the administration and the majority of the colleges. The others are mostly located on the Benjamín Núnez Campus, named for the founder of the National University and its first president (1973–1977).

The main campus was named to honor a famous Costa Rican educator, Omar Dengo Guerrero who spent his education career at the Normal School of Costa Rica, which eventually became the National University.

In recent years there have been efforts to upgrade the infrastructure on campus through the UNA-BCIE agreement, which aimed to renovate some of the older buildings such as the College of the Arts and College of Social Sciences Buildings.

== Schools and Faculties ==
- Faculty of Philosophy and Letters
  - School of Literature and Language Sciences
  - Ecumenical School of Religious Studies
  - School of Philosophy
  - School of Bibliotechnology, Documentation and Information
- Faculty of Exact and Natural Sciences
  - School of Biological Sciences
  - School of Chemistry
  - Department of Physics
  - School of Computing
  - School of Mathematics
  - School of Topography, Cadastre and Geodesy
- Faculty of Health Sciences
  - School of Veterinary Medicine
  - School of Sports Science
- Faculty of Social Sciences
  - School of History
  - School of Sociology
  - School of Planning and Social Promotion
  - School of Professional Secretariat
  - School of International Relations
  - School of Economics
  - School of Business Administration
  - School of Psychology
- Faculty of Land and Sea
  - School of Agricultural Sciences
  - School of Environmental Sciences
  - School of Geographical Sciences

== Institutes and Centers ==
- Centro de Estudios Generales
- Centro de Investigación, Docencia y Extensión Artística (CIDEA)
- Centro de Investigación y Docencia en Educación (CIDE)
- Instituto de Estudios Sociales en Población (IDESPO)
- Centro Internacional de Política Económica (CINPE)
- Centro Información Documental de Ciencias Sociales
- Instituto de Investigación y Servicios Forestales (INISEFOR)
- Instituto Internacional en Conservación y Manejo de Vida Silvestre (ICOMVIS)
- Observatorio Vulcanológico y Sismológico de Costa Rica (OVSICORI)
- Centro de Investigaciones Apícolas Tropicales (CINAT)
- Instituto Regional de Estudios en Sustancias Tóxicas (IRET)
- Biblioteca Especializada
- Instituto de Estudios Latinoamericanos
- Instituto de Estudios de la Mujer
- Centro de Estudios de Medio Oriente y África del Norte (CEMOAN)
- Programa de Investigación en Enfermedades Tropicales (PIET)

== See also ==
- Universidad Nacional, School for International Relations
