= Pecado de amor =

Pecado de amor may refer to:

- Pecado de amor (film), a 1961 Argentine musical drama film
- Pecado de amor (1978 TV series), a Mexican telenovela
- Pecado de amor (1995 TV series), a Venezuelan telenovela
