= Poor Millionaires =

Poor Millionaires may refer to:

- Poor Millionaires (1936 film), Swedish film
- Poor Millionaires (1957 film), Mexican film
- Poor Millionaires (1959 film), Italian film
