= Luis Cruz (disambiguation) =

Luis Cruz is a Mexican baseball shortstop.

Luis Cruz may also refer to:

== Other sportsmen ==
- Luis Cruz (Uruguayan footballer) (1925–1998), Uruguayan football midfielder
- Luis Cruz (Honduran footballer) (1952–2021)
- Luis Cruz (boxer) (born 1985), Puerto Rican boxer
- Luis Cruz (Mexican footballer) (born 1997), Mexican football forward
- Luis Cruz (athlete) in 1984 Central American and Caribbean Junior Championships in Athletics
- Luis Cruz (rower), participated in Rowing at the 2003 Pan American Games
- Sergi Luís Cruz, manager of FC Palafrugell

== Other fields ==
- Luis Cruz Almeida (c. 1885–1942), Chilean journalist and politician
- Luis Cruz Donoso (1916–2008), Chilean diplomat and politician
- Luis F. Cruz, Puerto Rican accountant
- Luis Cruz Martínez (1866–1882), Chilean soldier
- Luis Cruz Meza (1876–1932), Costa Rican lawyer, journalist and social reformer
- Luis Cruz Ocampo (1890–1973), Chilean politician
- Luis Cruz Steghmanns (1892–1947), Chilean journalist and politician
- Luis Cruz (governor) (1905–1986), Argentine politician, governor of Tucumán
- Luis Carrión Cruz (born 1952/1953), Nicaraguan politician
- Luis Raúl Torres Cruz (born 1960), Puerto Rican politician
- Luis Hernández Cruz (born 1958), Mexican politician

== See also ==
- José Luis Cruz Cruz (born 1959), Puerto Rican politician
