= Los fenómenos del futbol =

- Starring: Antonio Espino «Clavillazo», Dacia González, Sara García, Kitty de Hoyos, Yolanda Ciani
- Release date: 1964
- Country: Mexico
- Language: Spanish

Los fenómenos del futbol (English: The Phenomena of Football) is a 1964 Mexican action comedy film directed by Manuel Muñoz Rodríguez and starring Antonio Espino «Clavillazo», Dacia González, Sara García, Kitty de Hoyos and Yolanda Ciani. It is the sequel to the film of the same year, Las Chivas Rayadas, where Rogaciano Reyes (Clavillazo), once became famous playing for CD Guadalajara with his brother, tries to get his chances to play in the World Cup in the Mexican squad while trying to get ends meet with a love interest. He got a position in the World Cup and became more famous by scoring the historic goal that allows Mexico to tie the game with Wales.
