= Luis Cruz Meza =

Costa Rican lawyer, educator, journalist, and social reformer

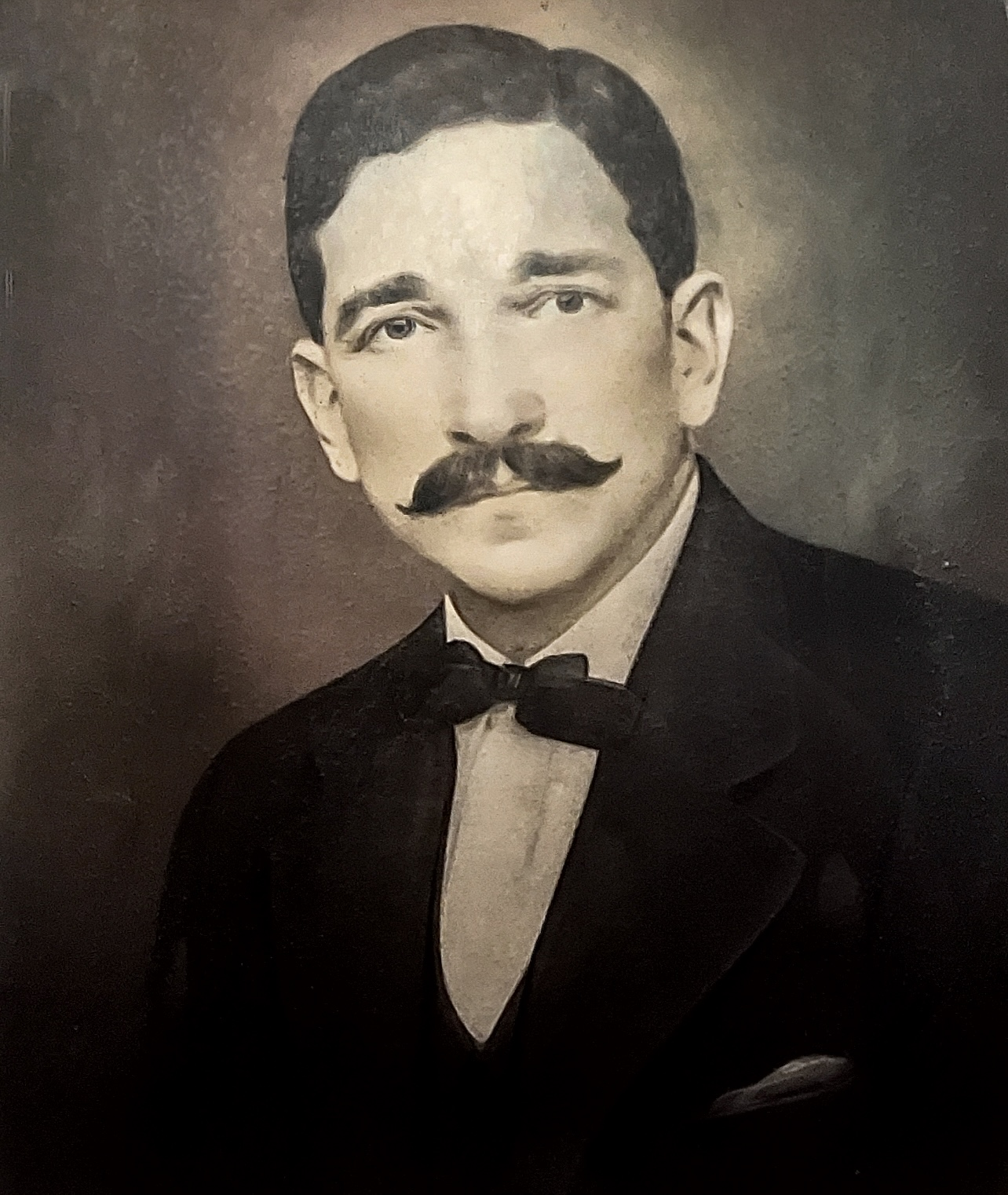
- Born: 1876; Heredia, Costa Rica
- Died: 1932 (aged 55–56); San José, Costa Rica
- Education: University of Guatemala
- Occupations: Lawyer, educator, journalist, social reformer
- Known for: Founder of the first School of Agriculture in Costa Rica
- Spouse: María Engracia Delia Bolaños Meza
- Children: Alfredo Cruz Bolaños

Luis Cruz Meza (Heredia, 1876 – San José, 1932) was a Costa Rican lawyer, educator, journalist, and social reformer. He founded the first School of Agriculture in Costa Rica in 1914 and promoted reforms in law, education, ecology, and Central American integration. He was the father of educator Alfredo Cruz Bolaños.

== Biography ==
=== Early life and education ===
Cruz Meza was born in Heredia in 1876. He completed his secondary education at Colegio San Luis Gonzaga in Cartago and graduated from the Liceo de Costa Rica in 1896. He later moved to Guatemala to study law at the University of Guatemala, where he graduated as a lawyer in 1901.

=== Professional and intellectual career ===
In 1902, he founded the Cruz Meza law firm in San José. That same year, he launched the legal journal "Estudios Jurídicos," and in 1905, he founded the monthly publication "El Foro," focused on law, jurisprudence, and social sciences.

He served as a civil judge and taught Psychology, Logic, and Ethics at the Liceo de Costa Rica. He was a member of the Ateneo de Costa Rica and co-founder of the Center for Economic Studies along with Joaquín García Monge.

=== Journalism and social reform ===
He directed newspapers such as "La Unión Republicana," "El Imparcial," and "Diario Nuevo" in Costa Rica and Guatemala. In 1913, he stated: “There can be no democracy without the education of the people,” highlighting his commitment to popular education.

He was an early advocate for social security, civil service, and reforestation—policies that would later be implemented by the state. In 1921, he promoted Central American Union through the Federal Central American Committee.

=== Agricultural education and ecology ===
In 1914, he founded the first School of Agriculture in Costa Rica in Curridabat, considered the origin of the country’s agricultural education.

In 1921, he founded the National Central School of Agriculture in Guatemala, extending his vision to the regional level. He also promoted the creation of the National Reforestation Society in Costa Rica.

=== Personal life and legacy ===
He married María Engracia Delia Bolaños Meza in 1903. He was the father of Alfredo Cruz Bolaños, national director of sports.

In 1945, a rural school in Cervantes, Cartago was named “Escuela Granja Luis Cruz Meza” in his honor. In 1987, he was declared a Distinguished Citizen of the canton of Montes de Oca.

== See also ==
- Alfredo Cruz Bolaños
- Education in Costa Rica
- History of agriculture in Costa Rica
