= El castillo de los monstruos =

1958 film

- Directed by: Julián Soler
- Written by: Fernando Galiana; Evangelina Elizondo; Carlos Orellana
- Produced by: Heberto Dávila Guajardo; Jesús Sotomayor Martínez
- Starring: Antonio Espino «Clavillazo» Evangelina Elizondo
- Cinematography: Víctor Herrera
- Edited by: Sigfrido García; Carlos Savage
- Music by: Gustavo César Carrión
- Distributed by: Columbia Pictures (USA)
- Release date: 1958
- Running time: 90 minutes
- Country: Mexico
- Language: Spanish

El castillo de los monstruos ('The Castle of the Monsters') is a 1958 Mexican horror comedy film directed by Julián Soler and starring Antonio Espino «Clavillazo» and Evangelina Elizondo.

In the film, a mad scientist named after Sputnik uses hypnosis to convert a seamstress into his lover. The seamstress' previous love interest enters the mad scientist's castle to rescue the damsel in distress. He has to face the castle's monsters, including look-alikes of the Frankenstein Monster and Count Dracula.

== Plot ==
Mexican funnyman, Antonio Espino «Clavillazo», is in love with a seamstress named Beatriz and also hangs out with a variety of odd characters, including a newsboy and a mental patient.

Meanwhile, a mad scientist named Dr. Sputnik and his scarred, hunchbacked assistant are busy making monsters at the nearby castle. The doctor poses as a kindly blind man in town and uses hypnosis to lure Beatriz to his castle, brainwashing her into believing that she is his own love and that she is named Galatea.

Clavillazo, with an assist from his friends, blunders his way into the castle, where he spends most of his time being chased around by various monsters. There is the butler, who looks like the Frankenstein Monster. The other monsters include a werewolf, a mummy, a vampire (clearly modeled after Count Dracula), and a gill-man (clearly patterned after Creature from the Black Lagoon). There is also another unidentified monster being kept in a cell (why it is not allowed to run free with the rest is unknown; the creature is referred to as a "gorilla" in some reviews, however, it appears to be more of a humanoid ape-like creature, perhaps based on Dr. Jekyll and Mr. Hyde).

In the end, Clavillazo manages to defeat the monsters, mostly by luck, and to rescue the girl. A chemical in Sputnik's lab devolves the gill-man into a big fish, the werewolf is choked out by the monster in the cell (perhaps that is why he was kept behind bars), Frankenstein accidentally electrocutes himself by grabbing a power cable in the lab and turns into cogs and clock-parts, the mummy falls into a pit of alligators and is devoured, and the vampire vanishes when the sun rises. Dr. Sputnik has the usual falling out that all mad scientists seem to eventually have with their deformed assistants (usually due to the scientist mistreating his assistant, or the assistant developing a crush on a girl the scientist has designs on, or sometimes a combination of both), resulting in his being shot after he stabs the scarred hunchback.

Clavillazo and Beatriz are trapped in a room and about to be crushed by the walls moving together when they are rescued in the nick of time by the rest of the gang, and they all live happily ever after.

== Cast ==
- Antonio Espino as Clavillazo
- Evangelina Elizondo as Beatriz / Galatea
- Carlos Orellana as Don Melchor
- Guillermo Orea as El Cojo
- Germán Robles as the Vampire
- José Muñoz (as Jose Muñoz Wilhelmy)
- Jose Moreno Camacho
- Alejandro Reyna as Licenciado (credited as Alejandro Reyna Garcia)
- Leopoldo Pineda (credited as Leopoldo Pineda Magaña)
- Fernando Shewan

== Release ==
The film was released in the United States by Columbia.
