= Andrés Meza Murillo =

Andrés Meza Murillo (1894–1933) was a Costa Rican musician and poet who wrote under the pen name Domitilo Abarca.

Meza Murillo wrote in various modern styles and his works were regularly published throughout his productive life, but he came to national and then international attention as one of the pioneers of serious poetry written in the local rural dialects of Central America. He was a descendant of a storied Spanish noble family which included the line of powerful Marquises of San Miguel de Aguayo who played a major role in the development and expansion of the Spanish Empire into North America against French interests and the settlement of what would become Texas. Meza Murillo's great grandfather was the last official sent by the Spanish Crown to what would become Central America. His ancestor played a leading role in Central America's bloodless break from Spain and the events that followed for which he was stripped of his titles by the King of Spain and came to settle in what would become Costa Rica.

Meza Murillo grew up on his family's large estates where he came into contact with the rural dialects and communities. While sent to study abroad and accomplished in many fields, including politics where he served as the mayor of one of Costa Rica's major cities, he continuously published poetry in newspapers and journals under the pen name Domitilo Abarca until his death. He gained a large following and helped to develop a Central American voice in poetry in the beginning of the twentieth century as well as bringing attention to the rural communities who he gave voice to in his work. Upon his youthful death there were major articles in newspapers throughout Central America identifying him as Domitilo Abarca and lamenting his too early passing.

Meza Murillo was, however, prolific, and his large body of work remained very much alive. His poetry has been collected and published by EUNED (Editorial Universidad Estatal A Distancia) under the editorship of Alfredo Cruz Bolaños and Luis Ferrero. A new complete collection of his known works was published including several newly rediscovered poems which were preserved by his surviving daughter Gladys Meza de Dominguez who emigrated to New York following the death of her only sibling, her older brother also named Andres Meza, during the political unrest in the 1950s.

Reference: Bolanos, Alfredo Cruz and Ferrero, Luis Editors, Domitilo Abarca: Todos Sus Poemas San Jose, Costa Rica. EUNED 2002 ISBN 9968-31-234-7 (The latest most complete collection of his poems published by the Editorial University Estatal a Distancia in San Jose, Costa Rica. It also includes articles discussing his works and life.)
