= Pura Vida (film) =

1956 film by Gilberto Martínez Solares

¡Pura vida!, is a 1956 Mexican romantic comedy film written and directed by Gilberto Martínez Solares, and starring Antonio Espino «Clavillazo», Carmelita González and Maricruz Olivier, with the special participacion of the singer and actor José Alfredo Jiménez. This film is notable for popularizing the phrase pura vida, particularly in Costa Rica.

== Plot ==
The film follows the story of Melquiades Ledezma, who is expelled from his home town after being labeled a source of bad luck. Misfortune finds him in his new home when he is accused of robbery and intentionally starting fires. His unlucky streak ends when he finds a winning lottery ticket of a million pesos.

== Partial cast ==
- Antonio Espino «Clavillazo» as Melquiades Ledezma
- Carmelita González as Lucía
- Maricruz Olivier as Esperanza

== Legacy ==
Despite his constant blunders, Melquiades Ledezma keeps a positive attitude. As an adjective synonymous with "good" or "nice", he uses pura vida (lit. pure life) a total of thirteen times to describe people (such as the town mayor), objects (food and earrings) and an action (being invited for a meal). This optimistic response began to be emulated by some Costa Ricans after the film's release in that country.

Although used since the late 1950s in Costa Rica, wide adoption of the phrase seems to have been spurred by the comparison of quality of life in Costa Rica with the rest of Central America in the 1980s. In modern Costa Rica, the phrase has many meanings and can be used as a greeting, farewell, thank you, and to show admiration for an object, situation or person. The phrase has come to embody the character of Costa Rica.

== See also ==
- Costa Rica–Mexico relations
