= Las chivas rayadas =

1964 film

- Directed by: Manuel Muñoz Rodríguez
- Starring: Antonio Espino «Clavillazo», Dacia González, Sara García, Emily Cranz, Yolanda Ciani
- Release date: 1964
- Country: Mexico
- Language: Spanish

Las chivas rayadas (English: The Striped Goats) is a 1964 Mexican action comedy film directed by Manuel Muñoz Rodríguez and starring Antonio Espino «Clavillazo», Dacia González, Sara García, Emily Cranz and Yolanda Ciani. It was followed by a sequel filmed in the same year, Los fenómenos del futbol.

== Plot ==
The story is a kind-of homage to the football team CD Guadalajara, where the youngest brother of three, Rogaciano Reyes (Antonio Espino «Clavillazo») wants to fulfill his dream of playing for the Chivas, while helping his older brother improve his career as a goalkeeper, his other brother, a priest, to have chances as a luchador, and his sister as singer, all in the eyes of their strict mother (Sara Garcia).
