= Poor Millionaires (1957 film) =

Pobres millonarios
- Directed by: Fernando Cortés
- Written by: Fernando Cortés (screenplay), Fidel Ángel Espino (story)
- Produced by: Alberto Hernández Curiel, Jesús Sotomayor Martínez
- Starring: Antonio Espino «Clavillazo», Ana Luisa Peluffo, Irma Dorantes, Sara García, Malena Doria
- Cinematography: José Ortiz Ramos
- Edited by: Carlos Savage
- Music by: Manuel Esperón
- Release date: 25 December 1957
- Country: Mexico
- Language: Spanish

Pobres millonarios ("Poor Millionaires") is a 1957 Mexican drama comedy film written and directed by Fernando Cortés and starring Antonio Espino «Clavillazo», Ana Luisa Peluffo, Irma Dorantes and Sara García. This film features the film debut of Malena Doria.

== Cast ==
- Antonio Espino - Clavillazo
- Ana Luisa Peluffo
- Irma Dorantes
- Sara García - Doña Margarita del Valle
- Alejandro Ciangherotti - (as Alejandro Changuerotti)
- Emma Roldán
- Fidel Ángel Espino
- Malena Doria
- Víctor Manuel Castro - (as Manuel Castro)
- Lina Madrigal
- Julián García
- Francisco Reiguera - (as Paco Reiguera)
- Eduardo Charpenel
- José Luis Moreno - (as Jose Luis Moreno 'Pistache')
- José Wilhelmy - (as Jose A. Wilelmi)
