= Cultural Properties of Costa Rica =

The Cultural Properties of Costa Rica (Patrimonio Cultural de Costa Rica) refer to those tangible and intangible cultural properties that by decree has been awarded the distinction of being part of the cultural heritage of Costa Rica.

The properties are overseen by the Centro de Conservación Patrimonio Cultural, ascribed to the Ministerio de Cultura y Juventud.

== Tangible Cultural Properties ==
This list is organized by province.

=== San José ===
- Teatro Nacional de Costa Rica, inscribed in 1965.

=== Cartago ===
- Basilica of Our Lady of the Angels, inscribed on 1999/12/02

== Intangible Cultural Properties ==
=== National ===
Those intangible cultural properties of local importance for a community.

- "Our Little Lady of Guadalupe" festival, in Nicoya (Festividad "Nuestra Señorita Virgen de Guadalupe".)
- Chorotega pottery tradition. (La tradición artesanal de manufactura de objetos cerámicos con motivos chorotegas.)
- Bull parade (Tope de Toros.)
- Calypso music from Limón (Calipso Limonense.)
- Local Swing dancing (Swing Criollo.)

=== International ===
Those intangible cultural properties from Costa Rica that are deemed important for worldwide recognition.

- Traditional oxcarts from Costa Rica. Inscribed with UNESCO.
