= National Technical University (Costa Rica) =

National Technical University (Universidad Técnica Nacional) (UTN) in Costa Rica

Universidad Técnica Nacional
- Motto: ¡Tu futuro, es ahora!
- Type: Public, undergraduate, graduate.
- Established: 2008
- Rector: Dr. Emmanuel González Alvarado
- Students: 14,524 (2019)
- Location: Alajuela, Costa Rica; 10.0070°N 84.2166°W
- Website: www.utn.ac.cr

The National Technical University (Universidad Técnica Nacional) (UTN), was founded on 4 June 2008 as the fifth public university of Costa Rica. Its purpose is to provide the means for scientific and technical education to pursue the requirements of the country.

It was the result of merging several trade and craftsmanship schools that taught at the college level:

- Colegio Universitario de Alajuela (CUNA)
- Colegio Universitario de Puntarenas (CUP)
- Colegio Universitario para el Riego y Desarrollo del Trópico Seco (CURDTS)
- Escuela Centroamericana de Ganadería (ECAG)
- Centro de Investigación y Perfeccionamiento para la Educación Técnica (CIPET)
- Centro de Formación de Formadores y de Personal Técnico para el Desarrollo Industrial de Centroamérica (CEFOF)

== Campuses ==
- Main campus, in Alajuela canton.
- Pacific campus in Puntarenas canton.
- Atenas canton.
- Guanacaste, in Liberia canton.
- San Carlos canton.
