= Clavillazo =

Mexican actor and comedian (1910–1993)

Antonio Espino
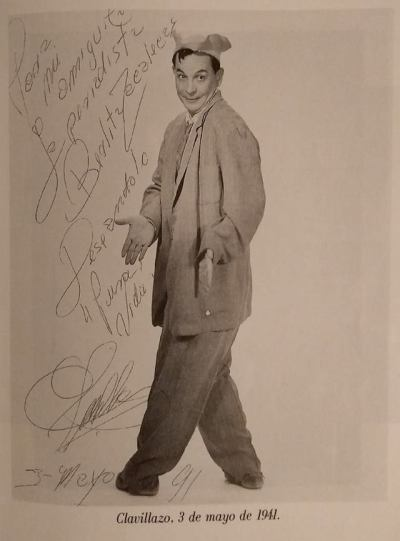
- Clavillazo in May 1941
- Born: 13 August 1910; Teziutlán, Mexico
- Died: 24 November 1993 (aged 83); Mexico City, Mexico
- Occupation: Actor
- Years active: 1941–1988

José Antonio Hipólito Espino Mora (13 August 1910 – 24 November 1993), known as Clavillazo, was a Mexican actor and comedian, who was mostly popular from the 1950s to the 1960s.

== History ==
His catchphrases were ""¡Pura vida!", "¡Ahí nomás!", en tono de alegría o "¡Nunca me hagan eso!", "¡Méndigo!"". He appeared in more than fifty films from 1941 to 1988.

== Selected filmography ==
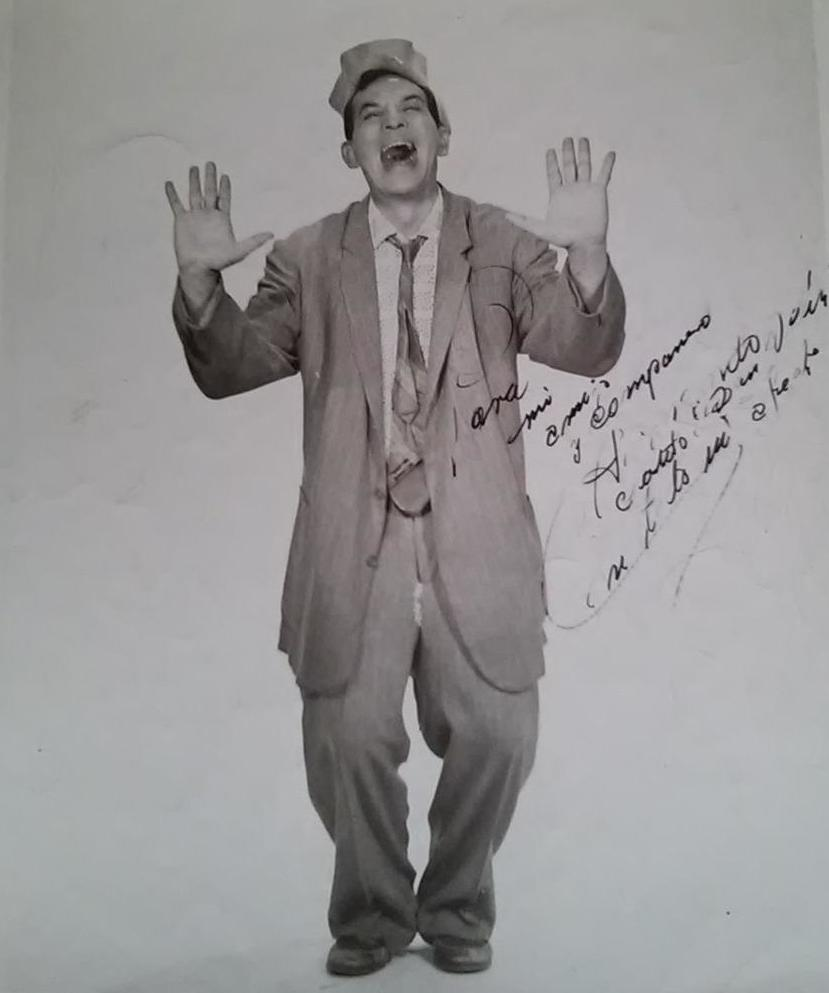
Clavillazo, c. 1941

Year	Title	Role	Notes
1953	Ahí vienen los gorrones	Martín	
1954	Se solicitan modelos	Facundo	
1956	El fantasma de la casa roja	Diógenes Holmes	
1956	Pura Vida	Melquiades Ledezma	
1957	Pobres millonarios	Clavillazo	
1958	Piernas de oro	Clavillazo Tachuela	
1958	The Castle of the Monsters	Clavillazo	
1960	El conquistador of the Moon	Bartolo	
1961	¡Mis abuelitas... no más!	Remigio Hernández	
1964	Las Chivas Rayadas	Rogaciano Reyes	
1964	Los fenómenos del futbol	Rogaciano Reyes	
