= Yolanda Ciani =

Mexican actress (1938–2023)

- Born: 25 January 1937; Chihuahua, Mexico
- Died: 3 September 2023 (aged 86); Mexico City, Mexico
- Occupation: Actress
- Years active: 1959–2016

Yolanda Ciani (25 January 1938 – 3 September 2023) was a Mexican actress. Her most notable film appearances were in the movies San Simón de los Magüeyes (1972) and La trenza (1975).

== Biography and career ==
Ciani was born in 1938 in Chihuahua, Mexico. In 1958, she participated in the Señorita México contest and came in second place. Later, she began her career as an actress in 1959, debuting with a minor role in the film Lágrimas de amor. Her most notable film appearances were in the movies San Simón de los Magüeyes (1972) and La trenza (1975). In soap operas, she participated in Victoria, Así son ellas and Valentina.

On 3 September 2023, Ciani died in Mexico City at the age of 85.

== Filmography ==
=== Films ===
- Suerte en la vida (La Lotería III) (1994)
- Un ángel para los diablillos (1993) .... Inés Coronado
- El jinete de la divina providencia (1991)
- Hembras de tierra caliente (1991)
- Los tres gallos (1991)
- Central camionera (1988)
- El mexicano feo (1984)
- Escuela de placer (1984)
- Todo un hombre (1983) .... Señora Monteros
- Cananea (1978)
- El mar (1977) ... Harriet
- El viaje (1977)
- La trenza (1975) .... Rosita
- Nosotros los feos (1973)
- San Simón de los Magüeyes (1973) ... María
- Carne de horca (1972) .... María Medina
- La recogida (1972)
- Todo el horizonte para morir (1971)
- Departamento de soltero (1971)
- La hermanita Dinamita (1970) .... Juanita López
- Matrimonio y sexo (1970)
- Sexo y crimen (1970) .... Susana
- El aviso inoportuno (1969)
- El hijo pródigo (1969) .... Carmelita
- El pícaro (1967)
- Napoleoncito (1964)
- Los fenómenos del fútbol (1964) .... Doris
- Las Chivas Rayadas (1964) .... Doris
- Dos alegres gavilanes (1963)
- Yo, el mujeriego (1963)
- Los parranderos (1963)
- El tesoro del rey Salomón (1963) .... Gema
- Aquí está tu enamorado (1963)
- Santo en el hotel de la muerte (1963)
- La sombra blanca (1963)
- La bandida (1963)
- Las troyanas (1963)
- Santo contra el rey del crimen (1962) .... Mercedes
- Lástima de ropa (1962)
- The Extra (1962)
- Jóvenes y bellas (1962)
- Los bárbaros del norte (1962)
- Pa' qué me sirve la vida (1961)
- Ellas también son rebeldes (1961) .... Amiga de Raquelito
- Yo, pecador (1959)
- Escuela de verano (1959)
- Lágrimas de amor (1959)

=== Soap operas ===
- Wild at Heart (2013) .... Celia
- Dos hogares (2011–2012) .... Martha de Colmenares
- Mañana es para siempre (2008–2009) .... Doña Úrsula
- Alborada (2005–2006) .... Doña Engracia
- Barrera de amor (2005–2006) .... Doña Norma
- Corazones al límite (2004–2005)
- Así son ellas (2002–2003) .... Marina Bolestáin
- El precio de tu amor (2000–2001) .... Isabel
- Ángela (1998–1999) .... Hortensia Solórzano Mateos Vda. de Bautista
- El premio mayor (1995–1996) .... Gladys
- Valentina (1993–1994) .... Lucrecia de Carmona
- La sonrisa del Diablo (1992) .... Casandra Adler
- Un rostro en mi pasado (1989–1990) .... Rosario
- Victoria (1987–1988) .... Verónica Moguel Oliva
- El engaño (1986) .... Clara
- Abandonada (1985) .... Marcia
- La traición (1984–1985) .... Roberta
- En busca del paraíso (1982–1983) .... Rosaura
- Infamia (1981–1982) .... Elvira Jiménez
- Secreto de confesión (1980)
- Pecado de amor (1978–1979) .... Beatriz
- Yo no pedí vivir (1977) .... Lucía
- La cruz de Marisa Cruces (1970–1971) .... Beatriz
- El diario de una señorita decente (1969) .... Beatriz
- Puente de amor (1969)
- Secreto para tres (1969)
- Cárcel de mujeres (1968)
- Los inconformes (1968–1969)
- Apasionada (1964) .... Martha

=== Television ===
- La rosa de Guadalupe (2009) .... Aurora (episode Los poetas malditos)
- Mujer, Casos de la Vida Real (2002–2004)
