= Pecado de amor (1978 TV series) =

- Genre: Telenovela
- Created by: Fernanda Villeli; Marissa Garrido
- Directed by: Alfredo Saldaña
- Starring: Jacqueline Andere; Ernesto Alonso
- Country of origin: Mexico
- Original language: Spanish

Production
- Executive producer: Ernesto Alonso

Original release
- Network: Canal de las Estrellas
- Release: 1978

Related
- Pecado de amor (1983)

Pecado de amor is a Mexican telenovela produced by Ernesto Alonso for Televisa in 1978.

== Cast ==
- Jacqueline Andere as Paula Otero / Chantal Luque
- Ernesto Alonso as Miguel Angel
- Enrique Álvarez Félix as Alberto
- Carmen Montejo as Cristina Otero
- Héctor Gómez as Raul
- Alfredo Leal as Jaime Leon
- Gonzalo Vega as Walter
- Nelly Meden as Victoria
- Yolanda Ciani as Beatriz
- Martha Zavaleta as Rosa
- Angélica Chain as Lina
- Rocio Brambila as Gina
- Yolanda Lievana as Fanny
- Agustin Sauret as Alfonso
- Alfonso Meza as Ramon
- Felipe Gil as Nino
- Ignacio Rubiell as Nacho
- Toni Saldaña as Toni
- Silvia Suarez as Eloisa
