= Alfredo Cruz Bolaños =

Costa Rican educator

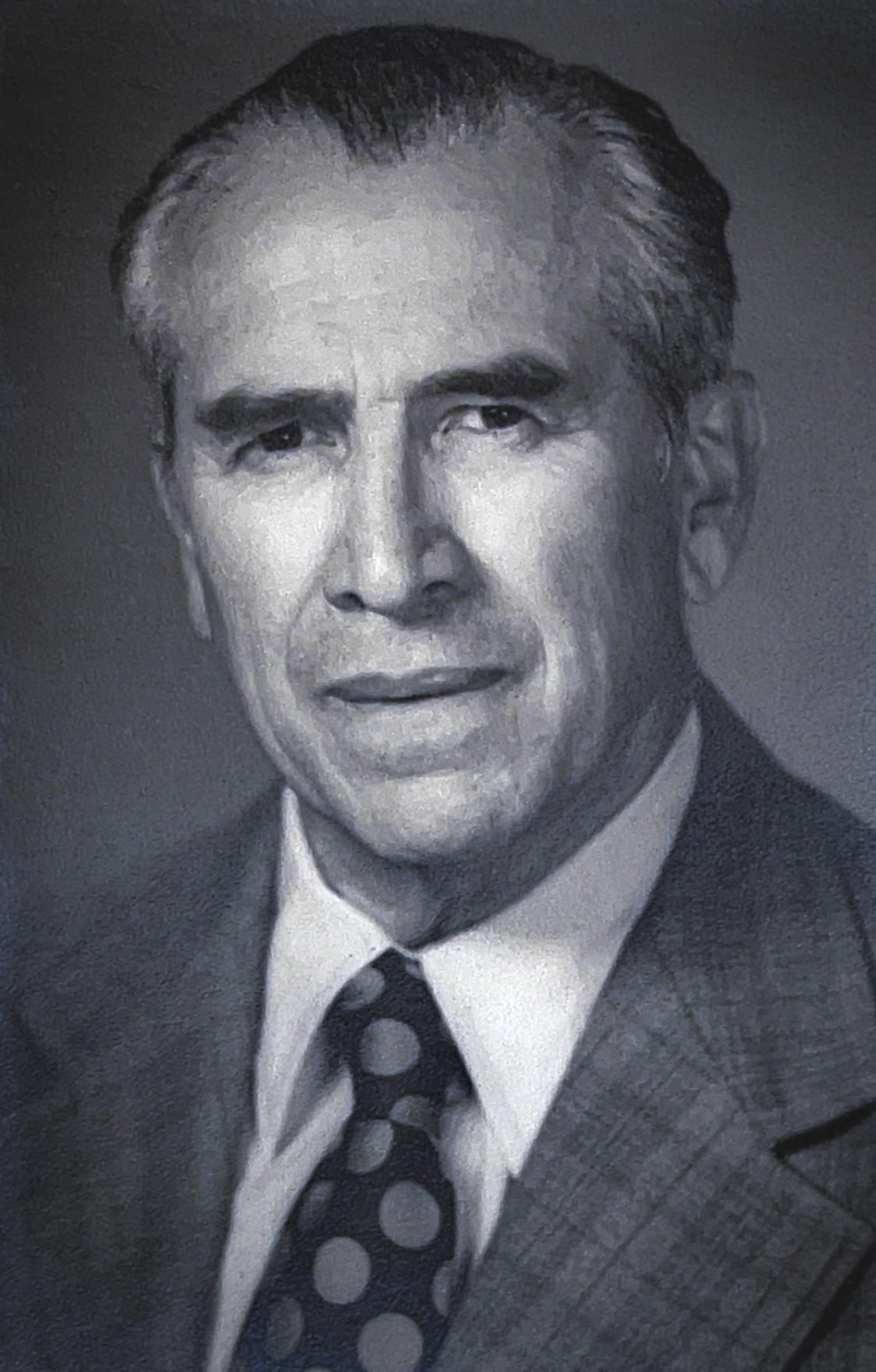
- Alfredo Cruz Bolaños, Costa Rican educator and sports promoter.
- Born: November 28, 1918; San José, Costa Rica
- Died: March 17, 2006 (aged 87); San José, Costa Rica
- Education: George Williams College, New York University
- Occupations: Educator, public official, sports promoter
- Known for: Promoter of sports in Costa Rica; creator of the Independence Torch Relay

Alfredo Cruz Bolaños (San José, Costa Rica, November 28, 1918 – San José, Costa Rica, March 17, 2006) was a Costa Rican educator, public official, and promoter of sports in Costa Rica. He is considered one of the pioneers of physical education in Costa Rica, recognized for institutionalizing school sports and promoting civic values through physical activity.

== Early life and education ==
Cruz Bolaños was born in San José, Costa Rica. From an early age, he showed interest in education and sports. At the age of 19, he traveled to the United States, where he became the first Costa Rican to earn a university degree in physical education, graduating from George Williams College and New York University.

== Professional career ==
In 1959, a public swimming pool was inaugurated in Lourdes de Montes de Oca and named after him: the Alfredo Cruz Bolaños Pool, intended for the free teaching of swimming to children from public schools. Promoted by Cruz Bolaños himself, the pool became a national reference for over three decades.

Upon returning to Costa Rica in 1938, he devoted himself to physical education. In 1944, he began teaching swimming at Pila Volio. He founded the National Institute of Physical Education (INEF) in 1946 and promoted the construction of the National Gymnasium and the restoration of the Ojo de Agua spring in Alajuela.

He introduced volleyball as a school sport in Costa Rica and reactivated the National Student Games in 1952. In 1959, he opened a swimming academy in Lourdes de Montes de Oca, where he trained over 80,000 Costa Ricans, including athletes such as Franklin Chang Díaz, Claudia and Silvia Poll, and coach Francisco Rivas.

== National Director of Sports ==
From 1964 to 1974, Cruz Bolaños served as National Director of Sports. During his tenure, he founded the Independence Torch Relay (1964) and promoted the creation of the Coffee Cup Tennis Tournament, the Tour of Costa Rica Cycling Race, and the Costa Rican Sports Hall of Fame.

== Honors and recognition ==
In 1988, he was inducted into the National Sports Gallery. In 1991, the Municipality of Montes de Oca declared him a Distinguished Citizen of the canton.

In 2005, the Government of Costa Rica declared the Torch Relay a National Symbol through Executive Decree No. 32647-C, in recognition of its creator.

Since 2007, ICODER has awarded the "Alfredo Cruz Bolaños Award" to the most outstanding athletes of the National Sports Games.

== Legacy ==
His legacy lives on in the institutionalization of physical education, civic school traditions, and the national sports culture. In addition to official honors, thousands remember his direct teaching and dedication. His name remains a symbol of national sports development and comprehensive youth education.

== Death ==
He died on March 17, 2006, in San José at the age of 87. He is buried in San Pedro de Montes de Oca, where he lived and developed much of his work.
