= List of Guatemalans =

A list of notable Guatemalans.

== A ==
- Abularach, Rodolfo, painter
- Álvarez, José Luis (1917–2012), painter
- Jackie Amezquita (born 1985), performance artist
- Andrade, Sergio, musician (bassist founder of Lifehouse)
- Acuña, Angelina writer of prose and poetry
- Argueta, Luis, film director
- Arbenz Vilanova, Arabella, actress, model, socialite
- Arbenz, Jacobo (1913–1971), military officer, former president
- Manuel José Leonardo Arce Leal (1935-1985), poet and dramatist
- Arenales Catalán, Emilio (1922–1969), diplomat. Foreign minister of Guatemala from 1966 to 1969 and the president of the United Nations Twenty-Third General Assembly from 1968 to 1969.
- Arévalo, Juan José, first democratically elected president
- Arjona, Ricardo, international singer
- Asturias, Miguel Ángel, writer, winner of the Nobel Prize in Literature (1967)
- Asturias, Rodrigo, guerrilla leader of ORPA, a.k.a. Comandante Gaspar Ilom, son of writer Miguel Ángel Asturias
- Ayala Acevedo, Allan, track athlete, national record holder in 400, 400 hurdles, and 1600 relay
- Aycinena y Piñol, Juan José, ecclesiastical and intellectual conservative in Central America

== B ==
- Barrios, Justo Rufino, General, leader of the Liberal movement, dictator
- Barrondo, Erick, Olympic Silver medalist racewalker
- Batres Montúfar, José, writer
- Berganza, Eddie, writer, Executive Editor of DC Comics
- Bressani Castignoli, Ricardo, nutrition expert and biochemist
- Bosch Gutierrez, Felipe A., businessman
- Bosch Gutierrez, Juan Luis, businessman

== C ==
- Cardoza y Aragón, Luis, writer, essayist, poet, art critic, and diplomat
- Carnage, DJ and music producer
- Carrera, Rafael, general, conservative politician, and President of Guatemala
- Castillo Armas, Carlos, colonel, politician
- Rafael Castillo Valdez, politician and diplomat
- Castillo, Otto René, poet, guerrilla member of FAR
- Chacón González, Lázaro Army General, former President
- Chinchilla Recinos, María (1909–1944), schoolteacher
- Cordón, Kevin, national badminton player
- Coroy, María Mercedes, Mayan actress
- Cumez, Paula Nicho, artist
- Rosa Elena Curruchich (1958-2005), painter
- Curruchich, Sara, singer-songwriter
- del Águila, Cynthia (born 1959), Minister of Education 2012–2015

== E ==
- Estrada Cabrera, Manuel, lawyer. Secretary of Foreign during Jose Maria Reina Barrios government. President of Guatemala from 1898 to 1920.
- Espada, Rafael, Vice President of Guatemala and former cardio-thoracic surgeon

== F ==
- Flaquer Azurdia, Irma, journalist
- Flores, Alejandra, soprano
- Flores, Mateo, athlete

== G ==
- Franz Galich (1951–2007), writer
- Galeotti Torres, Rodolfo, sculptor
- García Granados y Saborío, María (1860–1878), socialite
- García Granandos y Zavala, María Josefa (1796–1848), intellectual, writer, journalist and poet
- García Laguardia, Jorge Mario, jurist, magistrate of the Constitutional Court, and Ombudsman for Human Rights
- Gerardi Conedera, Juan José, Roman Catholic bishop
- Goldman, Francisco, writer
- Gomez Carrillo, Enrique (1873–1927), writer
- González Palma, Luis, photographer
- Gutierrez, Juan José, businessman
- Dionisio Gutierrez Mayorga, businessman

== H ==
- Hendricks, Ted, retired American Football linebacker

== I ==
- Isaac, Oscar, Guatemalan-American actor

== J ==
- Jensen, Alfred Julio, artist

== L ==
- La Rue, Frank William, human rights activist
- Lehnhoff, Dieter, composer, conductor, musicologist
- Lopez, Antonio, Guatemalan-Mexican soccer player
- Lubitch Domecq, Alcina, writer
- Lucas García, Fernando Romeo, general, former President

== M ==
- Mack, Myrna, anthropologist
- Marroquin, Manny, Grammy Award-winning mixer/engineer
- Martinez, Benito, American actor of Guatemalan descent
- Menchú, Rigoberta, winner of the Nobel Peace Prize (1992), indigenous woman, activist, author
- Menkos, Jonathan, politician, economist and writer
- Mérida, Carlos, painter
- Mendez, Francisco, (1907–1962) writer
- Milla y Vidaurre, José (Salome Jil) (1822–1882), writer
- Monteforte Toledo, Mario, writer
- Monterroso, Augusto, writer, winner of the Prince of Asturias Award of literature (2000)
- Monterroso, Sandra, visual artist and designer
- Montúfar y Rivera, Lorenzo (1823–1898), politician and lawyer.
- Morales, Jimmy, President of Guatemala
- Moreno, Gaby, singer and songwriter
- Mulet, Edmond, diplomat
- Mussack, William Joseph, Jr., engineer
- Óscar Murúa, artist

== P ==
- Palencia, Karl M., Record Producer (Pina Records), aka Myztiko
- Palma, Gustavo Adolfo (1920–2010), singer, lyric tenor
- Paniagua España, Carlos Eduardo (1915-1988), diplomat
- Pappa, Marco, Guatemalan national team and Seattle Sounders FC footballer
- Peña Aldana, Carlos Enrique, winner of Latin American Idol 2nd season
- Pezzarossi, Dwight, retired Guatemalan National Team and CSD Comunicaciones footballer
- Plata, Juan Carlos, retired Guatemalan National Team and CSD Municipal footballer

== Q ==
- Quevedo, Fernando, Professor of theoretical physics, Cambridge, England
- Quezada Toruño, Rodolfo, Cardinal, Archbishop of Guatemala City

== R ==
- Ramírez, Guillermo, retired Guatemalan national team footballer
- Ramirez de León, Arnoldo, guerrilla leader of EGP a.k.a. Comandante Rolando Morán
- Raudales, Henry, violinist
- Recinos, Adrián, lawyer, historian, Mayanist scholar, essayist, and diplomat
- Recinos, Efraín, engineer, architect, painter, sculptor, muralist, scenographer, inventor
- Robles, Rodolfo, physician, discovered onchocercosis (Robles disease)
- Robles, Stheven, professional footballer
- Rodriguez Macal, Virgilio, writer
- Ríos Montt, Efraín, general, dictator, stands accused of genocide
- Rodríguez Beteta, Virgilio (1885–1967), lawyer, historian, diplomat and writer
- Rosenthal, Gert, economist and diplomat
- Ruiz, Carlos, Guatemalan national team and CSD Municipal footballer

== S ==
- Sandarti, Héctor, television personality
- Sandoval, Kevin, soccer player, 1988 Summer Olympics
- Saravia, Rodrigo, Guatemala national team footballer
- Shery, singer, songwriter and producer
- Soluna Samay, singer, songwriter

== T ==
- Tecún Umán, sixteenth century leader of the K'iche' Maya people
- Tobar, Hector, writer/journalist
- Turcios Lima, Luis Augusto, Guatemalan army officer, guerrilla leader (FAR)

== U ==
- Ubico, Jorge, military dictator
- Urruela Federico, diplomat

== V ==
- de la Vega, Jazmín, architect and politician
- Villatoro, Anton, professional cyclist
- Villatoro, Alan, International Christian singer, music producer
- Viñals, Jaime, mountaineer (scaled seven highest peaks in the world)
- von Ahn, Luis, computer scientist, creator of CAPTCHA technology, professor of Carnegie Mellon University
- Luis H. Velasquez, (30 December 1919 – 9 February 1997) was a Guatemalan long-distance runner who competed in the 1952 Summer Olympics. He was third in the 1951 Pan American Games marathon and third in the 1955 Pan American Games marathon.

== W ==
- Wurmser, Juan Mauricio, advertising firm founder, president and CEO
- Whitbeck, Harris, CNN's International Correspondent based in Mexico City

== Y ==
- Yela Günther, Rafael, sculptor
- Yon Sosa, Marco Antonio, Guatemalan army officer, guerrilla leader MR-NOV13

== Z ==
- Zamora, José Rubén, journalist
- Zelaya, Raquel, economist and politician
- Zuniga, Daphne, Guatemalan-American actress
