= Curruchich =

Curruchich is a surname. Notable people with the surname include:

- Andrés Curruchich (1891–1969), Guatemalan painter
- Rosa Elena Curruchich (1958–2005), Guatemalan painter
- Sara Curruchich (born 1993), Guatemalan singer-songwriter
