= María del Carmen Pérez Cuadra =

Nicaraguan writer (born 1971)

- Born: November 28, 1971 (age 54); Jinotepe, Carazo, Nicaragua
- Education: Central American University (Managua)
- Occupation: Writer

María del Carmen Pérez Cuadra (born November 28, 1971, in Jinotepe, Carazo) is a Nicaraguan writer. She has won multiple awards for her poetry and short narrative writing, and published multiple books. As of December 2020, she was a doctoral candidate in Literature at the Pontifical Catholic University of Chile.

== Life ==
Pérez Cuadra's father was a bricklayer, and her mother was a nursing assistant. She was motivated to become a writer by an interview of Franz Galich that she read in the cultural supplement of a newspaper.

In the late 1990s, Pérez Cuadra moved to Costa Rica to work as a domestic worker to pay for her bachelor's degree, which she received from Central American University (Managua). She later received a master's degree in Latin American and Central American literature from the same university, with a thesis analyzing the writing of Central American short stories during and after the period of the Sandinista revolution.

In 2010, Pérez Cuadra and her family moved to Santiago, Chile for work reasons, intending to stay for two years. Their stay lasted longer, and she eventually applied to the Pontifical Catholic University of Chile as a doctoral candidate in Literature. As of December 2020, she was still a doctoral candidate there.

Pérez Cuadra's writing often deals with feminist and gay themes, although she does not consider herself a feminist writer. Her story "Une ciudad de estatuas y perros" explores migration and culture.

== Books ==
- Sin luz artificial: narraciones [Without artificial light: narrations], in Spanish, published 2004
- Une ciudad de estatuas y perros [A city of statues and dogs], in Spanish, published 2014
- Rama. Microficciones [Branch. Microfictions], in Spanish, published 2016
- Isonauta [Isonaut], in Spanish, published 2020

== Awards ==
- Rafaela Contreras Central American Short Narrative Prize, 2004
- El Cisne National Prize for Unedited Poetry, 2008
- María Teresa Sánchez National Prize for Short Narrative, 2014
