= Irma Flaquer =

Guatemalan journalist (1938–1980)

- Born: Irma Marina Flaquer Azurdia; 5 September 1938; Guatemala City, Guatemala
- Disappeared: 16 October 1980 (aged 42)
- Status: Unknown
- Occupations: Psychologist; journalist
- Spouse: Fernando Valle Avizpe (m. 1955; div. 1958)
- Children: 2

Irma Flaquer (5 September 1938 – disappeared 16 October 1980) was a Guatemalan psychologist and journalist known for her pointed critiques against the Guatemalan government. Flaquer survived an assassination attempt before her enforced disappearance in October 1980.

== Early life and education ==
Irma Marina Flaquer Azurdia was born on 5 September 1938 in Guatemala City to Fernando Flaquer, an actor and theater producer for a travelling zarzuela troupe, and Olga Marina Azurdia (died 1949), an opera singer. Flaquer's father was Catalan and had immigrated to Havana as a child, whilst her mother was born in New Orleans to Guatemalan and Nicaraguan parents who later returned to Guatamala. Flaquer had one younger sister and one younger half brother. Flaquer's parents divorced whilst she was a child, and her mother died when she was 12 years old.

Throughout her childhood Flaquer travelled with her father's zarzuela troupe across Central and South America.

Initially studying law, Flaquer later obtained a degree in psychology.

== Career ==
In 1958, she started a column in the Guatemalan newspaper La Hora, entitled "Lo que otros callan" which she would later transfer over to La Nación in the years 1971 to 1980.

In 1979, Flaquer founded and chaired the first Human Rights Commission of Guatemala.

Flaquer was a member of the Guatemalan Journalists Association (Spanish: Asociación de Periodistas de Guatemala).

== Attempted assassination ==
In 1979, a car bomb was set off as she opened the door, injuring her hand and leaving her deaf in one ear.

== Disappearance ==
On 16 October 1980, Irma attended her grandson's fourth birthday party. It was also believed to be a last farewell to her son Fernando, his wife, Mayra Rosales, and her grandson, Fernando, before she left for Nicaragua the next day. While she and Fernando drove back to her apartment, they were stopped a block away from her apartment by two cars surrounding their car. Fernando was shot in the head and Irma cried out for a doctor for her son. She was grabbed and taken away. Her body has not been recovered and it is believed she was executed.

=== Investigation ===
On 11 March 1997, the Inter-American Press Society filed a petition with the Inter-American Commission on Human Rights, alleging that the Guatemalan State had violated the right to life, the right to a fair trial, the right to freedom of expression and the right to judicial protection.

The petition was transmitted to the Guatemalan State on 8 July 1997, which subsequently filed a response on 9 October 1997.

The investigation also led to the 2004 book Disappeared, A Journalist Silenced by June Carolyn Erlick.

== Personal life ==
In November 1955, aged 17, Flaquer married Fernando Valle Avizpe with whom she had two sons. Flaquer and Valle later divorced in 1958.

== See also ==
- List of Guatemalans
- List of people who disappeared
