= Francisco Méndez =

Guatemalan writer

Francisco Méndez (1907-1962) was a Guatemalan poet and short-story writer born in Joyabaj, El Quiché. He published his first poem at the age of eighteen, and moved to the city of Quetzaltenango shortly after. A self-taught writer, he went on to publish numerous volumes of poetry, including the celebrated Nocturnos. He wrote for the Guatemala City newspaper El Imparcial from 1935 until his death, and he is linked to a generation of Guatemalan writers from the 1930s known as the Tepeus. His book of memoirs and short stories, Stories of Joyabaj, was published posthumously .

== Sources ==
- Words Without Borders
- Pagina de Literatura Guatemalteca
- Ministerio de Cultura, Guatemala
- The Archive of Hispanic Literature on Tape: A Descriptive Guide, by Francisco Aguilera, Library of Congress Latin American, Portuguese, and Spanish Division. Washington: Library of Congress, 1974.
