= Ixchel Museum of Indigenous Textiles and Clothing =

- Museo Ixchel del Traje Indigena
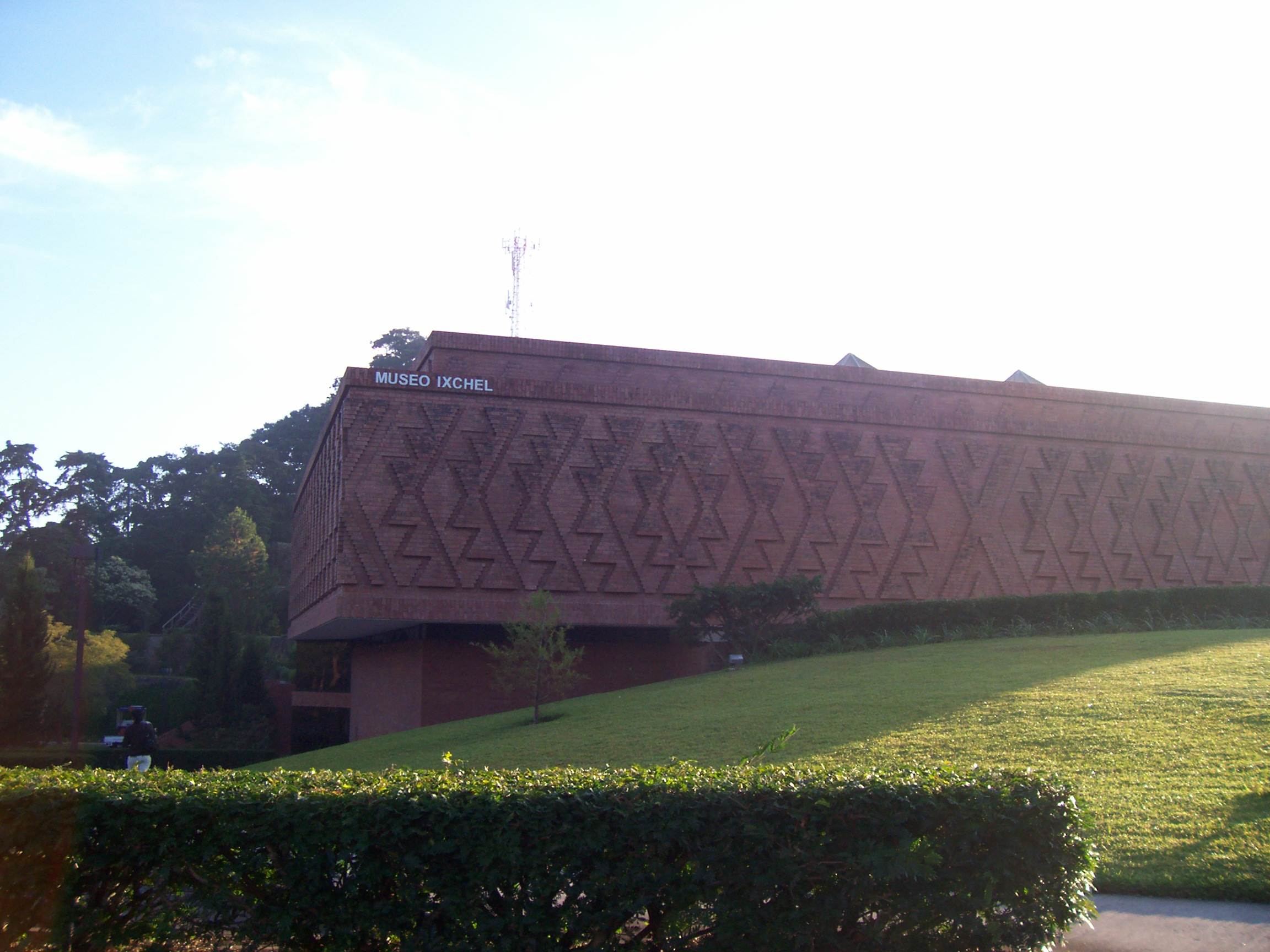
- Established: 1993
- Location: Francisco Marroquin University, Guatemala City, Guatemala
- Coordinates: 14°36′28.27″N 90°30′21.25″W
- Type: Textile museum
- Architects: Victor Cohen, Peter Giesemann, Augusto de Leon Fajardo, Adolfo Lau and William Pemüeller
- Website: www.museoixchel.org

The Ixchel Museum of Indigenous Textiles and Clothing (Spanish: Museo Ixchel del Traje Indigena) is a museum in Guatemala City, Guatemala. The museum explores the Guatemalan traditions of dress throughout the country and also has notable collections of ceramics, textiles, jewelry and books. The museum is housed on the campus of Francisco Marroquin University.

== History and exhibits ==
The museum's collections include hand-woven fabrics, ceremonial costumes, and clothing including huipil. While pre-Columbian textiles were not preserved, pottery, Mayan ruins and other artifacts are displayed. Textiles, materials, dyes and techniques from different eras, including the Spanish colonial era and present day, are represented. The museum building, located on the campus of Francisco Marroquin University, is designed to display textiles and its exterior looks like a woven textile pattern. Its exhibitions include works by painter Andrés Curruchich and artist Monica Torrebiarte, among others. The museum is significant in research and display of Guatemalan culture, particularly that of Guatemala's indigenous people.

Mayan weaving is one of the arts on display in the museum. In 2020, Fulbright scholar Erin Semine Kökdil collaborated with the Ixchel Museum of Indigenous Textiles and Clothing while filming a documentary about the traditional art of Mayan backstrap weaving.
