= Rosa Elena Curruchich =

Guatemalan artist

- Born: 1958; San Juan Comalapa, Guatemala
- Died: 2005 (aged 46–47)
- Known for: painting
- Style: self-taught
- Relatives: Andrés Curruchich

Rosa Elena Curruchich (1958–2005) was a Maya Kaqchikel visual artist who was born in San Juan Comalapa, Guatemala. Her work was represented in the 60th Venice Biennale.

== Career ==
The primary focus on her work deals with the role of women in Indigenous social milieux. According to the Archives of American Art's special archive of women artists research & exhibitions, many researchers consider her to be San Juan Comalapa's first woman painter. Her paintings have been described as "detailed and precise"; some of the subjects of her paintings include religious festivals, traditional customs, weaving and other artisanal practices. Curruchich began exhibiting her art in 1979 after teaching herself to paint earlier in that decade. Her first exhibition took place in Guatemala City and sold out quickly. After returning to her home, however, she was attacked by a group that believed her success "might actually take some of the capacity for earning money away from them." During the Guatemalan Civil War she painted on a small scale so as to easily and discreetly transport them. The miniature scale also allowed her to paint in secret. Each of her works include written text that describes the activities depicted in the painting.

=== Exhibitions ===
In 1979, Curruchich work premiered at the French Institute in Guatemala City. Her early work documented and reclaimed "the affective and political value of the parts of social life not often represented by male painters."

Her first solo show after she died was "Rosa Elena Pinta" at TEOR/éTica, Costa Rica. Curated by Miguel A. López, the show included 11 paintings. In addition to the Venice Biennale, Curruchich's work has been shown at the exhibition "And if I devoted my life to one of its feathers?" at the Kunsthalle Wien in Vienna. It has received critical attention from Artforum magazine, in addition to other publications. Miguel A. Lopez has written. "Her work reveals the personal history and the way in which Indigenous women practise political actions through communal work, setting it apart from liberal, Western feminism."

=== Personal life ===
Curruchich was the granddaughter of Andrés Curruchich who was an important Chapin painter.

Curruchich died in January 2005 from diabetes complications.

== Collections ==
Curruchich's work is held in the collection of the Museum of International Folk Art.
