= Óscar Murúa =

Guatemalan artist (1898–1980)

Oscar Murua
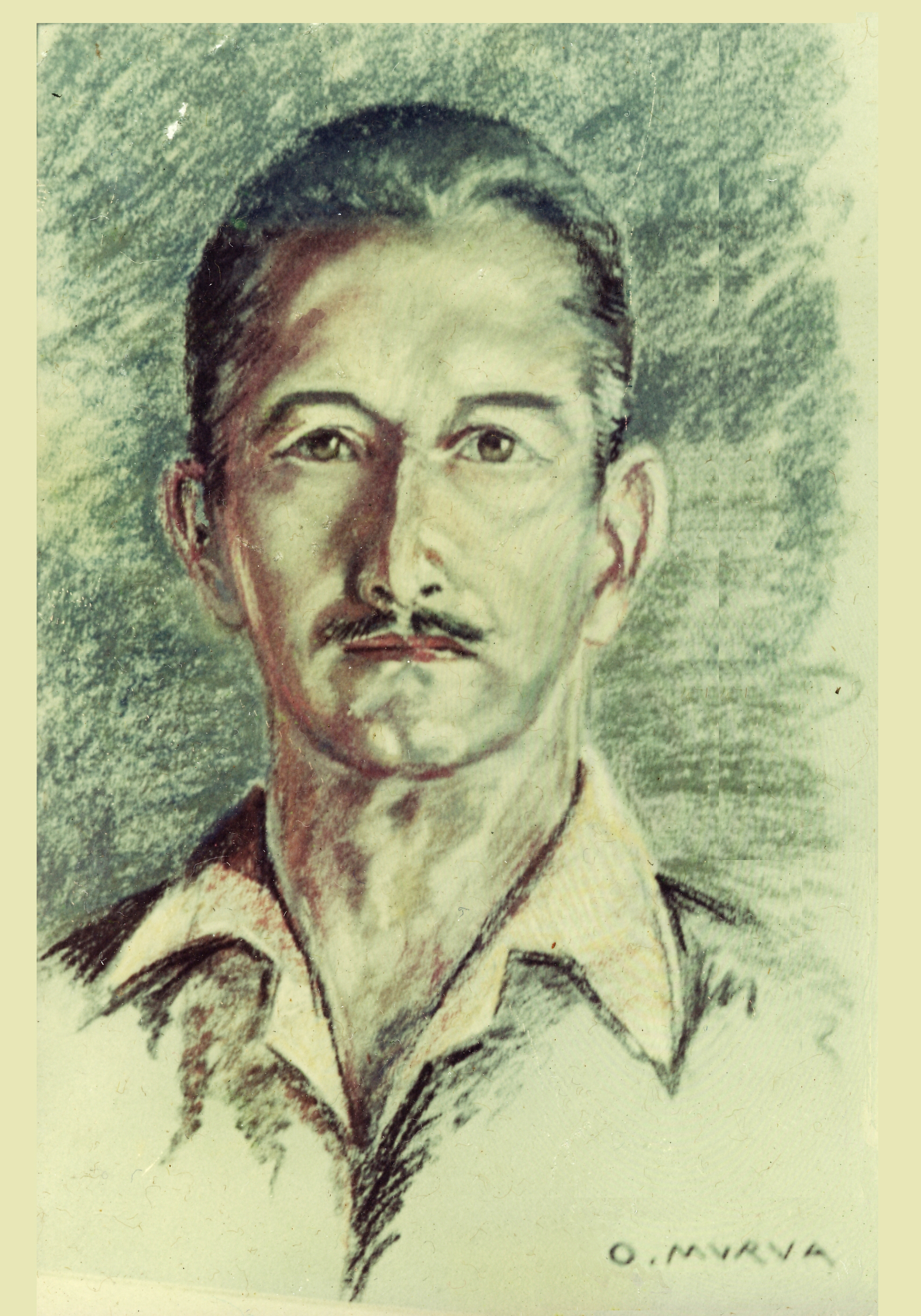
- Self-portrait
- Born: José Óscar Francisco Murúa y Sánchez de Robledo. 25 January 1898; Guatemala City, Guatemala
- Died: 1 April 1980 (aged 82); Guatemala City, Guatemala
- Known for: Painter
- Movement: Impressionism

José Óscar Francisco Murúa Robledo (1898–1980) was a Guatemalan artist. He was born to Spanish immigrant José Antonio Murúa y Valerdi in Guatemala City or Nueva Guatemala de la Asunción on 25 January 1898.

== Moving to Spain ==
Along with his parents and siblings departed from Puerto de San José, Escuintla, on 29 March 1903 on board the steamboat Colón, on which they traveled to Panama where they crossed the isthmus by train and boarded a steamboat to Cuba. On 5 May they arrived to Andalucía at Puerto de Cadiz on board the steamship Montevideo. They finally arrived to Madrid by train, a few days after they moved to a flat just a floor above of his paternal grandparents, at Plaza de las Provincias No. 1.

== Studies ==
On 31 October 1908 he enters the boarding of Colegio San Juan Bautista in Santoña, Cantabria. The next year on 1 October 1909 he enters the boarding of Colegio San Vicente de Paúl in Limpias, Cantabria. On 11 November 1910, along with his brother Fernando Murúa, enters the Academia Mata in Santander, Cantabria, where both study Commerce. By January 1913 they move back home in Madrid and continue their studies on Commerce at Academia Laguilhoat.

== Art beginnings ==
On 11 January 1915 he began taking art lessons in Madrid with Guatemalan artist Rafael Rodríguez Padilla who was studying at Academia de San Fernando.

== Moving back to Guatemala ==
Along with his father and his brothers Fernando and Héctor, he departed on 27 March 1915, on board the steamship Finland to New York City, stopping in Azores. On board the steamboat Marrowigne arrived to Guatemala on 21 April 1915.

== A new neighbour in Antigua Guatemala ==
On 1 April 1946, he moved with his wife Catalina and his two children to Antigua Guatemala, with the aim reconstructing an old house and a property in the back yard to open a hotel in that town. The hotel would be named "Casa de Murúa". On 14 March 1947 he was designated as President of the Asociación de Amigos de la Antigua Guatemala.

== Scouts and Sports ==
=== Spain ===
Scouts in Spain had begun just two years before Oscar and his brother Fernando Murúa joined 8vo. Grupo, Distrito de Palmas, of the Exploradores de España, on 20 November 1913. On 17 May 1914 he is named chief of the 6a. Patrulla of the 5to. Grupo.

=== Guatemala ===
In 1919 he was designated as captain of the España soccer team. On 10 January 1,924 he is admitted in the Club Deportivo Hércules and on 25 May named captain of the Hércules soccer team. On 13 August 1924 the Juegos Atléticos Municipales are held in Guatemala city where he wins the 800 metres race and receives from the nation's President, José María Orellana, a gold medal. On 11 January 1,925 during the Campeonato Nacional Olímpico he wins the gold medal for the 800 metres race, with a time of two minutes 16 seconds. On 29 January 1,927 he was designated as President of the Club Deportivo Hércules back then located at 6a. avenida and 11 calle zone 1.

== Artistic life ==
On 17 February 1918 he left the field for the first time with the intention of painting landscapes; and on 14 September that year he purchased a new box of paints for ten gold pesos. After the overthrow of dictator Manuel José Estrada Cabrera on the 10 April 1920, Carlos Herrera y Luna was designated by the National Assembly as president. Herrera was a wealthy businessman, a politician, and President of the Committee on Finances and Public Credit, who founded, in the City of Guatemala, the National Academy of Fine Arts. Rafael Rodríguez Padilla arrived at this academy to teach art, and Óscar was among the first students to enroll in the class that Rodríguez taught. Óscar also took courses on aesthetics, modeling, perspective, and painting.

He arranged his first exhibition on 11 March 1928, together with Eduardo De La Riva in the School of Fine Arts. On 11 May, he and artists Antonio Tejeda Fonesca, Ovidio Rodas Corzo, Rigoberto Iglesias, Leopoldo Alcaín and Jaime Arimany, formed a group they called TRIAMA Group, named by combining the first letter from each of their surnames. The group's headquarters was located at the corner of Eighth Avenue and Twelfth Street in Zone 1. The group lasted approximately three years, and didn't adhere to any political ideology or social position, instead focusing on promoting their interest in landscaping and carrying out painting sessions. In response to social demands the TRIAMA group was disbanded after Ovideo Rodas Corzo was inducted into the Asociación de Profesores y Estudiantes de Bellas Artes (the Association of Professors and Students of Fine Arts, or APEBA).

In 1928, Óscar received an Honourable Mention for his participation in the First National Exhibit of Art. On the 11 May 1930, the first exhibition of TRIMA Group was held at Club Guatemala. The group's second exhibition occurred on 21 June 1931, held in the School of Fine Arts. He received an Honourable Mention from the Arts and Crafts Club of New Orleans on 8 November 1940 for his watercolour of Antigua Guatemala displayed in the Exhibition of Modern Art from Central America. In 1942, he participated in the Latin American Exhibit in held in Macy's in New York City. Around this year, Óscar, along with Leopoldo Alcaín, Federico W. Schaeffer, Alfredo Gálvez Suárez, Humberto Garavito, Enrique de León Cabrera, Miguel Ángel Ríos, José Luis Álvarez, Antonio Tejeda, Ovidio Rodas, Rigoberto Iglesias, Leopoldo Alcaín and Jaime Arimany, created Galería Arcada, the first private art gallery in Guatemala.

In 1951 and 1951, he exhibited his oil, pastel, and watercolour works in Club Guatemala, Club Americano, Galería Capri and Galería Ríos. In 1978, he participated in the exhibition "Oil in 20th Century Guatemala", sponsored and organized for Organización Paiz, whose founders are now partners in Walmart Central America.

== Sickness and death ==
Some time after his 81st birthday, due to a heart condition he had a cerebral thromboembolism or stroke which leaves him hemiplegic. When he had a second stroke he died on 1 April 1980. His remains are in the family mausoleum in Cementerio General de Guatemala.
