= Juan Mauricio Wurmser =

CEO

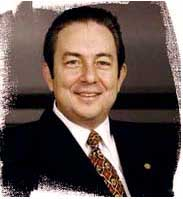
- Juan Mauricio Wurmser (1997)
- Born: Juan Mauricio Wurmser
- Education: College of New Jersey
- Occupation: Marketing
- Website: Wurmser Ogilvy & Mather

Juan Mauricio Wurmser is a founding partner, President and CEO of Wurmser Ogilvy & Mather, the O&M advertising firm in Guatemala. He is also founding partner and Chairman of Hill + Knowlton Strategies, Guatemala, the local subsidiary of this international public relations firm. He is a member of the Ogilvy Latina Executive Committee where he represents the Central American and Caribbean operations. Wurmser is involved in other business ventures in the marketing services and communications areas that include 141 Soho Square, MEC, Mindshare and Mediacom, all part of the WPP Group. He has more than 30 years of experience in the marketing of consumer goods throughout Latin America and a history of active participation in business chambers and organizations, as well as a spell of public service with the government of Guatemala.

== Career ==
Prior to joining WO&M and Hill and Knowlton Guatemala in mid-1998, Wurmser served as Minister of Economy and Commerce of Guatemala. He was responsible for trade and industry promotion - with special emphasis on attracting foreign investment - and coordinated the regional and global economic integration efforts of the Arzú administration. He was a key member of the Guatemalan Economic Cabinet and sat on the Monetary Board where monetary, credit and exchange policies were defined. He was also Chairman of the Board of Governors of the Central American Bank of Economic Integration between 1997 and 1998.

Before taking up public service, Wurmser was responsible for developing and implementing the franchise program of Pollo Campero, one of the most successful fast food restaurant chains in Central America, which led to its international expansion.

His years as a corporate marketing executive include early assignments with the Guatemala subsidiaries of Warner Lambert, Avon, and Colgate-Palmolive, before joining British American Tobacco in 1978, a company that he served for 15 years in Guatemala, Panama, Spain, Mexico, and Argentina before returning to Guatemala as president and General Manager of its local subsidiary.

Wurmser has been committed to fostering Guatemala's viability through his participation in business chambers and organisations through the years.

More recently, he was chosen by The Guatemalan Management Association as CEO of the Year 2015, one of the most coveted awards of the regional business community, followed by the early 2016 recognition as Guatemala's Entrepreneur of the Year by the Central American edition of The Economist magazine.

In mid 2016, affiliation agreements were signed by the Wurmser Communications Group with MEC and Mindshare, two of the global premier Media Investment Management companies, thus expanding further the WPP Group footprint in Guatemala and the Central American region.

== Other information ==
A native of Guatemala City, Wurmser holds a B.S. in business administration from The College of New Jersey (formerly Trenton State College) and also attended the graduate school of business of Universidad Francisco Marroquín in Guatemala.

Wurmser has been a member of the board of directors of the Chamber of Industry of Guatemala, was chairman of the Business Chamber of Guatemala in 1993 and also sat on the board of directors of the American Chamber of Commerce of Guatemala (AMCHAM) in 2009. He has been a board member of the Guatemalan Advertising Association (UGAP) over the years, having chaired it in 2001 and in 2013–2014. At present, he is also a member of the board of trustees of the Guatemala Development Foundation (FUNDESA).
