= San Juan Comalapa =

- Municipality and town
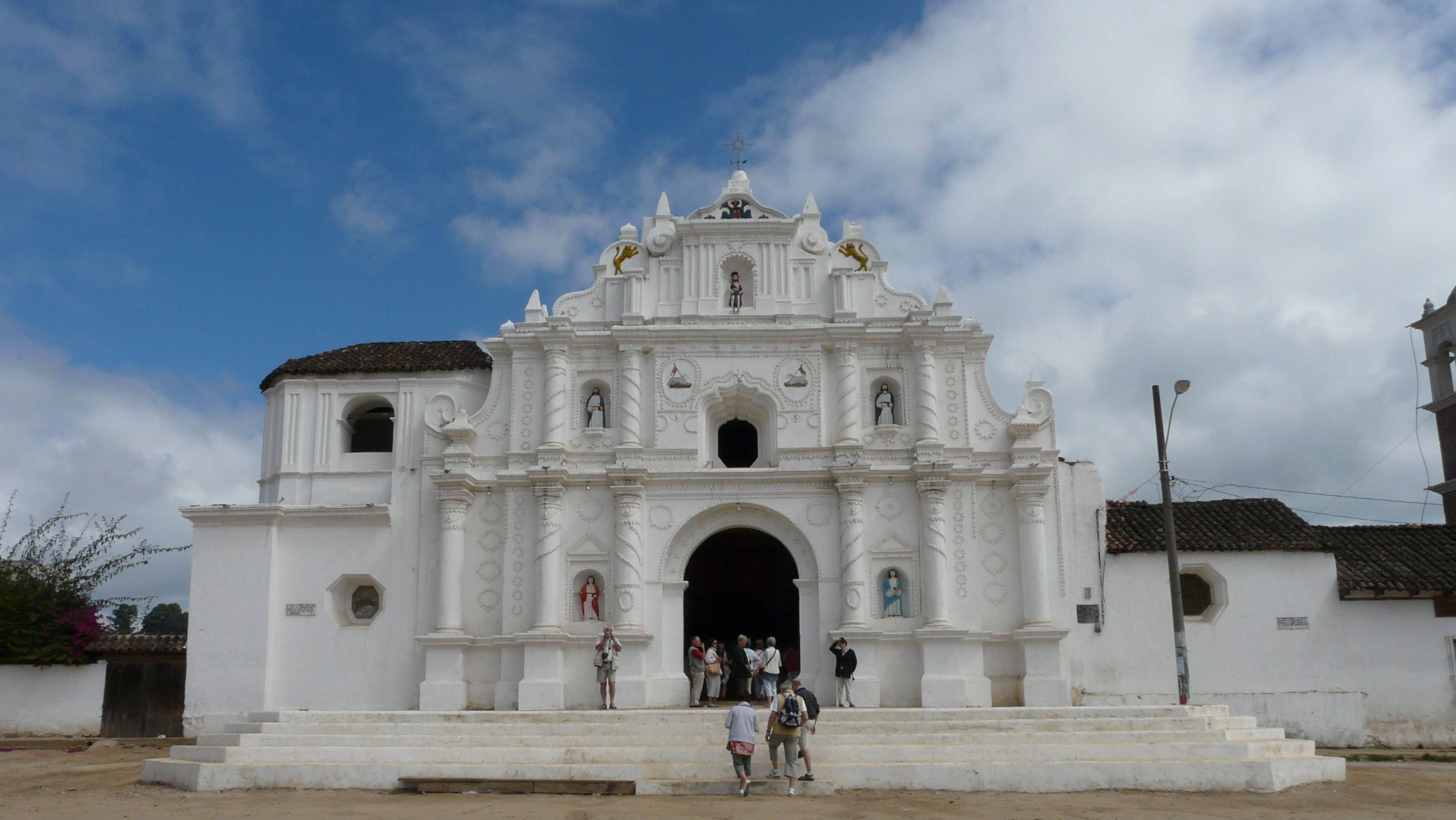
- Church, San Juan Comalapa

- Location in Guatemala
- Coordinates: 14°44′N 90°53′W
- Country: Guatemala
- Department: Chimaltenango

Government
  - Mayor (2016–2020): Justo Rufino Simlox Pichiyá

Area
  - Total: 48 sq mi (125 km^{2})

Population (2018)
  - Total: 48,597
  - Density: 1,010/sq mi (389/km^{2})
- Time zone: UTC+6 (Central Time)
- Climate: Cwb

San Juan Comalapa is a town, with a population of 32,312 (2018 census), and a municipality in the Chimaltenango department of Guatemala.

San Juan Comalapa is sometimes called the "Florence of America", because of the many Kaqchikel painters living there (one of the more celebrated painters being Paula Nicho Cumez). It is also the birthplace of Rafael Álvarez Ovalle, who composed the Guatemalan national anthem. The painting tradition started in the 1930s, when Kaqchikel painter Andrés Curruchich (1891–1969) started painting with oil. His creativity was noted so much that he started showing his art in the United States and achieved international success. Because of this, Curruchiche decided to teach the new generations his form of painting. Today there are some 500 painters in San Juan Comalapa, and the majority of them still use the techniques of Curruchiche. These painters are dedicated to paint the costumes, life experiences and traditions of the Indian towns.

== History ==
=== Spanish colony ===
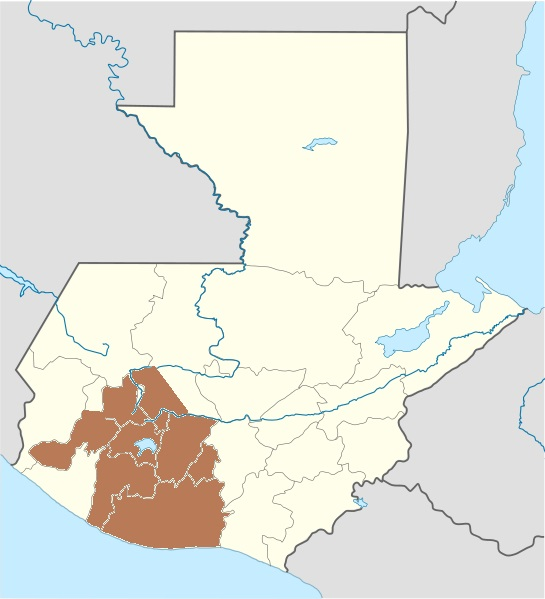
Some of the 24 convents of the Franciscan Provincia del Santísimo Nombre de Jesús during the Spanish colony in Guatemala and the approximate area it doctrines occupied.

In the 16th century, during the period of the Spanish conquest of Guatemala, the shore of the lake was the scene of a battle in which the Spanish and their Kaqchikel allies defeated the Tz'utujils. After the Spanish conquest of Guatemala, the Franciscans set up a church and monastery in Panajachel soon afterward, and used the town as a centre to convert the indigenous people of the region to the Roman Catholic faith. The original façade of the church still stands, and is considered one of the gems of the colonial style in Guatemala.

San Juan Comalapa was in charge of the franciscans, who had convents and doctrines in the area covered by the modern departments of Sacatepéquez, Chimaltenango, Sololá, Quetzaltenango, Totonicapán, Suchitepéquez and Escuintla. The "Provincia del Santísimo Nombre de Jesús" (English:"Province of the most Holy Name of Jesus"), as the Franciscan area was then called, reached up to 24 convents. By 1700, San Juan Comalapa had a convent with three priests, in charge of ca. 1800 people, one doctrine and eight cofradías.

Since it had a convent, there was daily Mass attended by cofradías leaders and their wives, who kept lighted candles during most of the ceremony. Also daily, there was religious teaching for 6-year-old girls and older starting at 2:00 pm and for boys of the same age starting at sunset; the class lasted for 2 hours and consisted on memorizing the church teaching and prayers and to make some exercises with the catechism and it was run by a priest or by elder natives, called "fiscales". Adults attended Mass every Sunday and holiday and after mass, there were religious teachings in their own language.

Lent was a time of the year when the friars prepared the natives thoroughly, using their own language to accomplish their goals; every Friday of Lent there was a procession following the Rosary steps all the way to the Calvary temple.

In 1754, as part of the borbon reforms, the Franciscans where forced to, gave their doctrines to the secular clergy; thus, when archbishop Pedro Cortés y Larraz visited Panajachel in 1770, he described it as a curato.

=== 20th century ===
The town was much devastated by the 1976 Guatemala earthquake. The town is home to the longest mural in Guatemala which chronicles the town's history from pre-Columbian times through colonization, the earthquake, the Guatemalan civil war, until the present.

== Sister cities ==
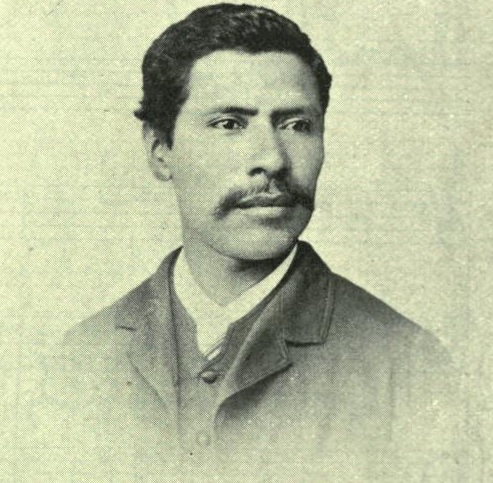
Composer Rafael Álvarez Ovalle, San Juan Comalapa native, in 1897. Photographs from La Ilustración Guatemalteca.

San Juan Comalapa has close ties to Stord Municipality in Norway, as they are friendship cities.

== Climate ==
San Juan Comalapa has a subtropical highland climate (Köppen: Cwb).

Climate data for San Juan Comalapa
Month	Jan	Feb	Mar	Apr	May	Jun	Jul	Aug	Sep	Oct	Nov	Dec	Year
Mean daily maximum °C (°F)	19.7 (67.5)	20.8 (69.4)	22.2 (72.0)	23.0 (73.4)	22.4 (72.3)	20.7 (69.3)	20.9 (69.6)	21.4 (70.5)	20.7 (69.3)	20.2 (68.4)	19.9 (67.8)	19.58 (67.24)	20.96 (69.73)
Daily mean °C (°F)	14.0 (57.2)	14.7 (58.5)	16.0 (60.8)	17.2 (63.0)	17.5 (63.5)	16.7 (62.1)	16.6 (61.9)	16.6 (61.9)	16.3 (61.3)	15.9 (60.6)	14.8 (58.6)	14.3 (57.7)	15.9 (60.6)
Mean daily minimum °C (°F)	8.4 (47.1)	8.6 (47.5)	9.8 (49.6)	11.4 (52.5)	12.6 (54.7)	12.8 (55.0)	12.3 (54.1)	11.9 (53.4)	11.9 (53.4)	11.6 (52.9)	9.8 (49.6)	8.8 (47.8)	10.8 (51.5)
Average precipitation mm (inches)	4 (0.2)	6 (0.2)	8 (0.3)	37 (1.5)	115 (4.5)	296 (11.7)	222 (8.7)	228 (9.0)	271 (10.7)	147 (5.8)	46 (1.8)	9 (0.4)	1,389 (54.8)
Source: Climate-Data.org

== Geographic location ==
San Juan Comapala is surrounded by Chimaltenango Department municipalities:

== See also ==
- List of places in Guatemala

== Notes and references ==
=== Bibliography ===
- Cortés y Larraz, Pedro (2001) [1770]. García, Jesús María; Blasco, Julio Martín (eds.). Descripción Geográfico-Moral de la Diócesis de Goathemala. Corpus Hispanorum de Pace. Segunda Serie (in Spanish). Consejo Superior de Investigaciones Científicas. ISBN 9788400080013. ISSN 0589-8056.
- García Añoveros, Jesús (1989). "Las misiones franciscanas de la Mosquitia nicaragüense" (PDF). Actas del III Congreso Internacional sobre los franciscanos en el nuevo mundo (Siglo XVII) (in Spanish). Madrid, Spain: DEIMOS; Universidad Internacional de Andalucía.
- La Ilustración Guatemalteca (1897). "Don Rafael Alvarez". La Ilustración Guatemalteca (in Spanish). 1 (17). Guatemala: Síguere, Guirola y Cía.: 249.
