= Paula Nicho Cumez =

Mayan-Guatemalan artist

Paula Nicho Cume
- Born: January 15, 1955 (age 71)
- Known for: Painting

Paula Nicho Cumez (born January 15, 1955) is a Mayan-Guatemalan artist. Cumez is inspired by Mayan tradition and culture and focuses on expressing the context of native women’s experience in her artwork; additionally, Cumez was inspired by the Popol Vuh. Cumez is known for creating an artist community of women within the Tz’uthil Mayan artists, named "Kaqchikel Surrealist Painters.” Additionally, a short film was made about Paula Nicho Cumez’s background called Del Azul al Cielo.

== Biography & Tz'utujil Foundations ==
Paula is a self-proclaimed Mayan and Guatemalan artist who was a weaver before she became a painter, and whose influence stems from both her contemporary culture and ancestry. Through the encouragement of her grandfather Francisco Cumez (a sculptor himself) to develop her artistic skills and learning from her teacher and future-husband Salvador Cumez Currichich, she began her career at thirty years old in 1985. Paula Nicho Cumez is an artist from the town of San Juan Comalapa and is part of a greater Tz’utujil Mayan artist community. Cumez’s husband, Salvador Cumez Currichich, is also an artist from the same community. Another artist that is internationally known that is from this same town is Andrés Curruchich. Regardless, an interesting distinction between the male and female artists of this community that one should acknowledge is: that where male artists focus more on ritual processions, female artists focus on surrealism. Cumez identifies with her Maya Kaqchikel culture, and this is demonstrated through her various artworks. There are four cities which compose the Tz’utujil: (1) San Pedro de la Laguna, (2) Santiago Atitlán, (3) San Juan de la Laguna, and (4) San Juan de la Comalapa. However, the art from where Cumez’s was raised is in key ways different from the others, as this city is the only one that does not surround Lake Atitlán.

== Artworks ==
Cumez's work is attributed with surrealist artistic types, and many view her works as being reflective of art naif (native art). Many of her works are oil on canvas. One of her more prominent works is, Processo y Visión de los Acuerdos de Paz (2007) which depicts the goddess Ixchel and El Principio de Una Nueva Era (2012) which represents the end of the indigenous Baktun 5,125 cycle. Additionally, Corazon del Maiz (2004) is an oil on the wood painting which is cited in scholarly works. In the introduction section titled "Mayan Women as History," the artwork is used as a way to discuss a contemporary Central American exploited agricultural economy and how this affects working-class labour opportunities in third world countries. To see her works you can visit the following websites: 1 Arte Maya and Novica. Author and researcher Staikidis in regards to Cumez's work state, "the paintings become visual metaphorical windows into Mayan Kaqchikel female cultural worlds." Furthermore, this can be seen through artworks that carry these motifs such as, Mi Segunda Piel which is a series of two painting one made in 2002 and one made in 2004.

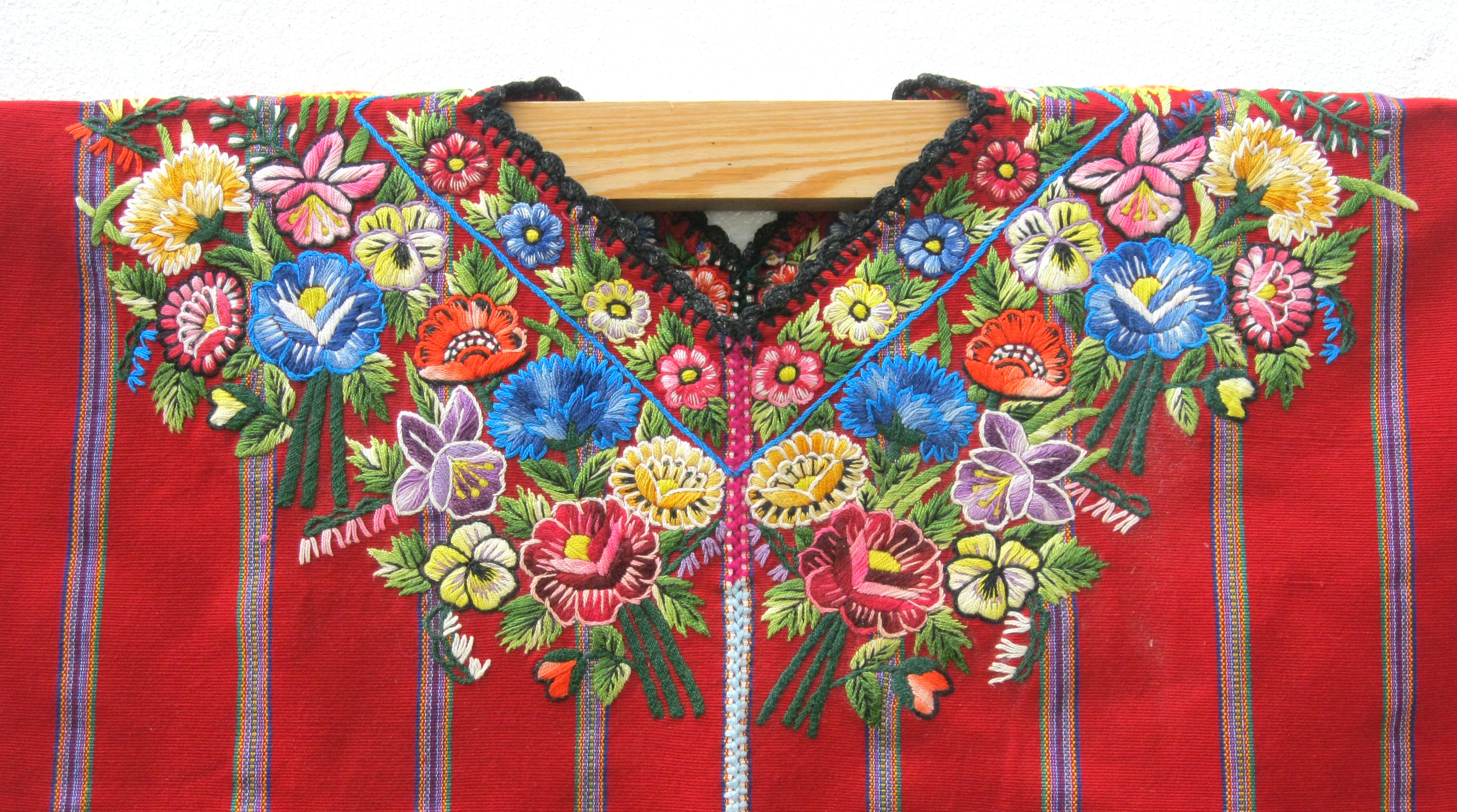
Guipils: these are traditional and indigenous clothes which are used by the women specifically in Tz'utujil Mayan culture. Regardless they are typical Guatemalan garments with a variety of floral designs and bright colours.

The artworks reflect the narratives of Mayan-indigenous culture in Guatemala, and by creating narratives in the story there is a sense of individualized and embraced Tz’utujil Mayan identity. The use of weaving as a motif of female authorship and ownership is seen throughout the works: for example, the Mother Nature (1995) with the mountains substituted as guipils. The use of guipils and the acts of weaving relate to not only Cumez's upbringing but Mayan cosmology such as to Ixchel (which is also incorporated in her works). This indigenous clothing appears in works such as Canto a La Naturaleza, Nuestra Madre Tierra as well as Mi Segunda Piel.

== Research ==
Cumez has been cited in numerous scholarly articles which discuss the engendering of Latin American art history and has helped improve the visibility of the indigenous narratives at the undercurrent of many Central-American countries. For example, working with Dr Kryssi Staikidis of Northern Illinois University, Cumez is aiding in research of indigenous mentorship-models in aims of restructuring the way in which art is taught today. Additionally, through research, Cumez has, to an extent, both aided in the broadening of European-centered art history as well as stressed the importance of indigenous Mayan art-history. Cumez has worked with professors and students to help them rethink the way in which art is created and utilized as a form of liberation; she helps people acknowledge how in some cases art can bridge groups together, as seen through her ability to mentor others outside of her own culture through indigenous-centred art. Cumez is also profiled in a scholarly book that discusses implementing art and social justice education into the classroom and has a chapter devoted to her own work, which relates her subject matter to the realities of immigration. An example of such artworks that discuss these realities can be seen in Cumez's Crossing Borders.
