= Virgilio Rodríguez Beteta =

Guatemalan lawyer and historian

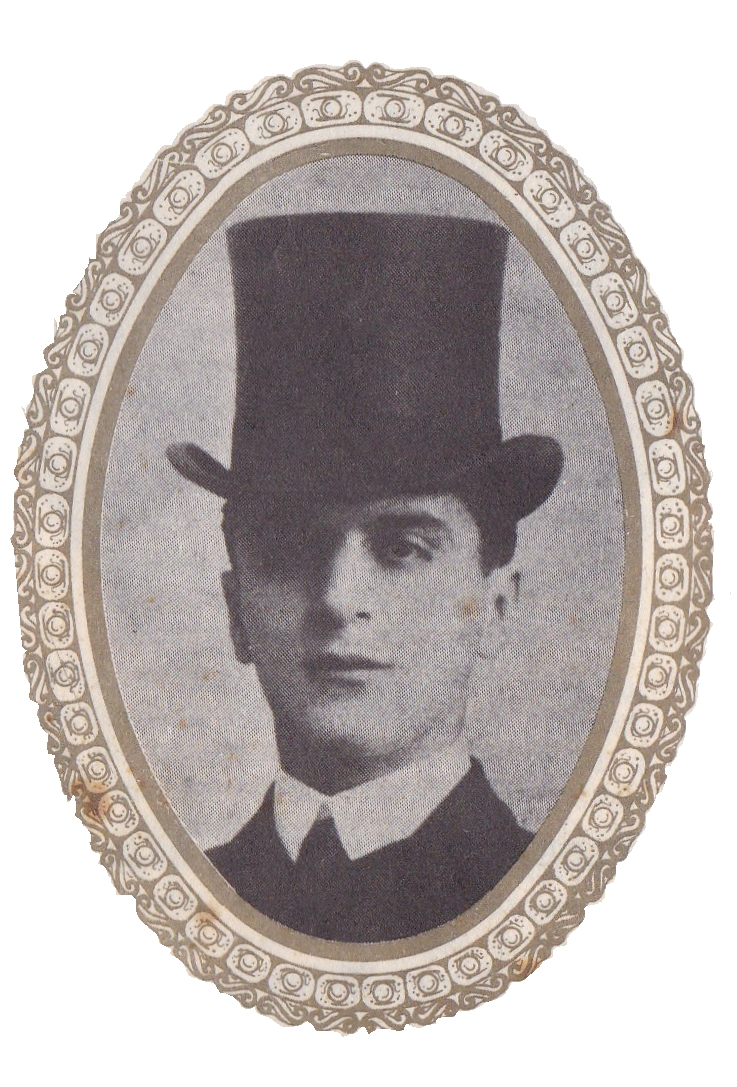
- Born: March 10, 1885; Guatemala City, Guatemala
- Died: March 10, 1967 (aged 82); Guatemala City, Guatemala
- Education: University of San Carlos of Guatemala
- Occupations: Lawyer, historian, diplomat, writer
- Known for: Ambassador of Guatemala to Honduras, Spain, Chile, Colombia and the League of Nations; founder of the Academy of Geography and History of Guatemala
- Spouse(s): Elisa Macal Asturias; Marta Josefina Herrera; Carmen Martínez Arboleda
- Children: Virgilio Rodríguez Macal; Martha Rodríguez; Roberto Rodríguez-Beteta Herrera; Luz María Rodríguez-Martínez Beteta

Virgilio Rodríguez Beteta (1885–1967) was a Guatemalan lawyer, historian, diplomat and writer.

== Biography ==
Rodríguez-Beteta was born in Guatemala City on March 10, 1885, son of General Luis Beteta and Luz Rodriguez Laredo, descendant of the discoverer of California, Juan Rodriguez Cabrillo. He graduated as a lawyer at the University of San Carlos of Guatemala.

In his first marriage, with Elisa Macal Asturias, he had two children, writer Virgilio Rodríguez Macal and a daughter, Martha. From his second marriage to Marta Josefina Herrera, he had one child, Roberto Rodríguez-Beteta Herrera, an airplane pilot and music composer (marimba). From his third marriage with Carmen Martínez Arboleda, he had another child, Luz Maria Rodriguez-Martinez Beteta, a journalist, Industrial Psychologist and mountaineer.

Rodríguez-Beteta lived for extended periods in Honduras, Switzerland, Spain, Chile and Colombia, working in senior diplomatic positions representing Guatemala. He died in his hometown at the age of 82 years.

== Work ==
Rodríguez-Beteta was interested in history, politics and the culture of Guatemala. In 1917 he wrote the libretto for the opera Quiché Vinak. Along with Adrian Recinos, he founded the legal journal The Law, and was also one of the founders of the Society of Geography and History, now the Academy of Geography and History of Guatemala. He directed the Diario de Centro America.

He agreed to represent Guatemala as ambassador to the governments of Honduras, Spain, Chile and Colombia, as well as ambassador to the League of Nations in Geneva, Switzerland. His old age was devoted to historical research and political science and he publishing a series of books on a variety of topics in these disciplines.

== Published work ==
- La mentalidad colonial: ideologías de la independencia, doctrinas políticas y económico-sociales. Paris: Paris-América. 1926.
- El Partido liberal unificado ante la tumba de Barrios. Guatemala: Tipografía nacional. 1930. Discurso pronunciado el 2 de abril de 1930.
- El libro de Guatemala grande: Petén-Belice. Guatemala: Tipografía nacional. 1947.
- Los dos brujitos mayas: el cuento-novela de la antigüedad americana. Guatemala: Ministerio de Cultura, Departamento Editorial. 1958.
- La política inglesa en Centro América durante el siglo XIX. Guatemala: José de Pineda Ibarra/Ministerio de Educación Pública. 1963.
- La patria maya; del Istmo de Tehuantepec al de Panamá. Guatemala. 1963.
- Trascendencia nacional e internacional de la guerra de Centro América contra Walker y sus filibusteros. Guatemala: Editorial del Ejército. 1965.
- Solidarity and responsibilities of the United States in the Belize case. Guatemala: Tipografía nacional. 1965.
- No es guerra de hermanos sino de bananos; como evité la guerra en Centroamérica en 1928. Guatemala: Universidad de San Carlos de Guatemala. 1969.
