= Manuel José Leonardo Arce Leal =

Manuel José Leonardo Arce Leal (1935–1985) was a Guatemalan poet and dramatist.

Manuel José Leonardo Arce Leal was born in Guatemala City in 1935. Poet and dramatist, he was considered one of the most relevant national writers of the second half of the 20th century. He was awarded important Central American prizes and his works have been translated into many languages.

In the 1980s he had to flee Guatemala under the constant threats of Romeo Lucas García's regime. While he was in France, many of the worst massacres of his homeland occurred under the governments of Lucas García and Efraín Ríos Montt. In response, Arce wrote some very strong poems against Efraín Ríos Montt, which were later censured. He died of pulmonary cancer while in exile in France on September 22, 1985.

== Works ==
=== Poetry ===
- En el nombre del Padre, 1955
- De la posible aurora [Sonetos a mi esposa], 1957
- Cantos en vida, 1960
- Eternauta: cantos de un mar, 1962
- Los episodios del vagón de carga (anti-pop-emas), 1971
- Palabras alusivas al acto y otros poemas con el tema del amor, 1953-1978, 1978
- Poemas póstumos, 1987

=== Narrative ===
- Diario de un escribiente Tomo 1, 1979
- Diario de un escribiente Tomo 2, 1987
- De una ciudad y otros asuntos: crónica fidedigna, 1992

=== Plays ===
- Delito condena y ejecución de una gallina y otras piezas de teatro grotesco, 1971
- Diálogo del gordo y el flaco con una rocola.
- El gato que murió de histeria.
- Compermiso.
- Sebastián sale de compras.
- Torotumbo (adaption of novel by Miguel Ángel Asturias).
