= María Chinchilla Recinos =

Guatemalan teacher (1909–1944)

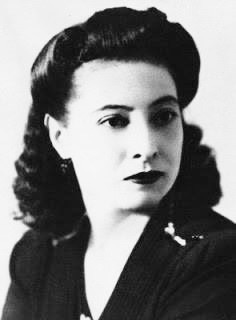
María Chinchilla in 1940

María Chinchilla Recinos, commonly known as María Chinchilla, (2 September 1909 – 25 June 1944) was a Guatemalan schoolteacher who was assassinated by the cavalry of General Jorge Ubico while taking part in a peaceful anti-government demonstration. She is honoured as a national heroine.

== Biography ==
Born in Asunción Mita in the Department of Jutiapa, Chinchilla qualified as a primary school teacher in Jalapa in 1927, the best student in her class. After teaching in Asunción Mita, she moved to Guatemala City in 1932 where she taught in several institutions.

In 1944, the schoolteachers submitted a request for an increase in salary to the country's dictator, General Ubico, while students from San Carlos University called for the university's independence. Discontent increased to such a point that on 25 June 1944, some 300 school teachers dressed in mourning embarked on a peaceful demonstration at the Church of St. Francis (five blocks from the National Palace) calling for freedom, democracy and the resignation of the dictator. Chinchilla, one of the demonstration's organizers, was among those who were killed when the government sent out troops and the cavalry to put an end to the protest. She was buried in the city's main cemetery where her tomb is known as the Panteón del Maestro (Teacher's Pantheon). Chinchilla is now regarded as a martyr and national heroine, having brought about Ubico's resignation five days after the demonstration.

On 6 July 1944, the Guatemalan teachers' association Asociación Nacional de Maestros resolved that 25 June would be celebrated annually as the Dia del Maestro (The Schoolteacher's Day) in memory of María Chinchilla Recinos.

== Bibliography ==
- Móbil, José Antonio (2010). La Década Revolucionaria 1944-1954 (in Spanish). Serviprensa Centroamericana. ISBN 978-9929-554-42-9.
- Ramírez Rodríguez, Oscar Enrique (2009). Profesora María Chinchilla Recinos: centenario de su nacimiento (2 de septiembre de 1909 2 de septiembre de 2009) (in Spanish). USAID.
