= Andrés Curruchich =

Guatemalan artist (1891-1969)

- Born: Andrés Curruchich Cúmez; 19 January 1891; San Juan Comalapa, Chimaltenango, Guatemala
- Died: 18 February 1969 (aged 78); San Juan Comalapa, Chimaltenango, Guatemala
- Relatives: Rosa Elena Curruchich (granddaughter)
- Awards: Order of the Quetzal, 1960
- Movement: Naïve art; Guatemalan folk art

Andrés Curruchich (1891–1969) was born in San Juan Comalapa, Guatemala, on January 19, 1891. He was a Guatemalan naïve painter of the Kaqchikel people from the Kaqchikel town of San Juan Comalapa.

Andrés Curruchich is considered the first and most important of the naïve painters of San Juan Comalapa. He is considered one of the first Maya painters and the founder of Guatemalan folk art. He began to paint in the 1920s as a means to try to earn extra money. In the 1930s and 1940s, he was invited to exhibit his works in various festivals and fairs in Guatemala. By 1950, his work was known in Guatemala City, and at this time he began to paint in oils on canvas. During the 1950s he exhibited in Guatemala City and at various galleries in the United States. Curruchich's works were primarily known for showcasing the lives and rituals of indigenous Guatemalans through a realistic lens. His paintings also documented the customs, lifestyles, and scenes from daily life of the people in San Juan Comalapa and surrounding villages. He showcases the variety of clothing used by the people in events from everyday life to even clothing saved for special occasions, such as festivals. He died in 1969, in San Juan Comalapa, Guatemala.

There is a permanent exhibition of his work at the Ixchel Museum of Indigenous Textiles and Clothing in Guatemala City.

Andrés Curruchich spawned a colony of Kaqchikel painters in San Juan Comalapa, which has become a centre for Mayan naïve art in Guatemala. Some 500 artists work in the town, many of them trained by Curruchich.

== Education ==
Andres Curruchich would go on to train his granddaughters, María Elena Curruchiche and Rosa Elena, as well as other artists such as Paula Nicho Cumez and Oscar Peren.

== Artworks ==
Muchachas Carriando Agua, 1963, oil on canvas

Curruchich depicts a woman from San Juan Comalapa getting water from the fountain. This painting shows how Curruchich viewed women in his community.

Plaza de Comalapa Venden Camaron n.d. oil painting on canvas

Features a man sitting under a tree, selling dried shrimp with a scale in hand. Surrounding him are woman, four of them dressed in the same colorful clothing, while another one behind them wears more dull clothing along with a basket or back behind them on their back. Behind the man there is more shrimp.

Fiesta de San Juan n.d. oil on canvas

It features three men trying to bullfight a bull, one with a donkey mask on. Behind the bull there a persona falling and a man sitting in defeat on the bull's side. There is a water fountain in the arena, meanwhile the outside/seating area of the arena is filled with people watching the men in the middle fight the bull.

== Select exhibitions ==
In 1958, Curruchich's work was presented in San Francisco, California and in New York, New York in the show Village Life in Guatemala.

== Collections ==
In the 1950s, Curruchich's work was featured in Guatemala City and in galleries in the United States, such as “El Museo del Barrio” in New York. There is a permanent collection of Curruchich's work at the Ixchel Museum of Indigenous Textiles and Clothing in the Guatemala City.

== Honors and awards ==
In 1960, Curruchich was awarded the Order of the Quetzal by the Guatemala government for his contributions to the nation.
