= Alejandra Flores =

Guatemalan soprano

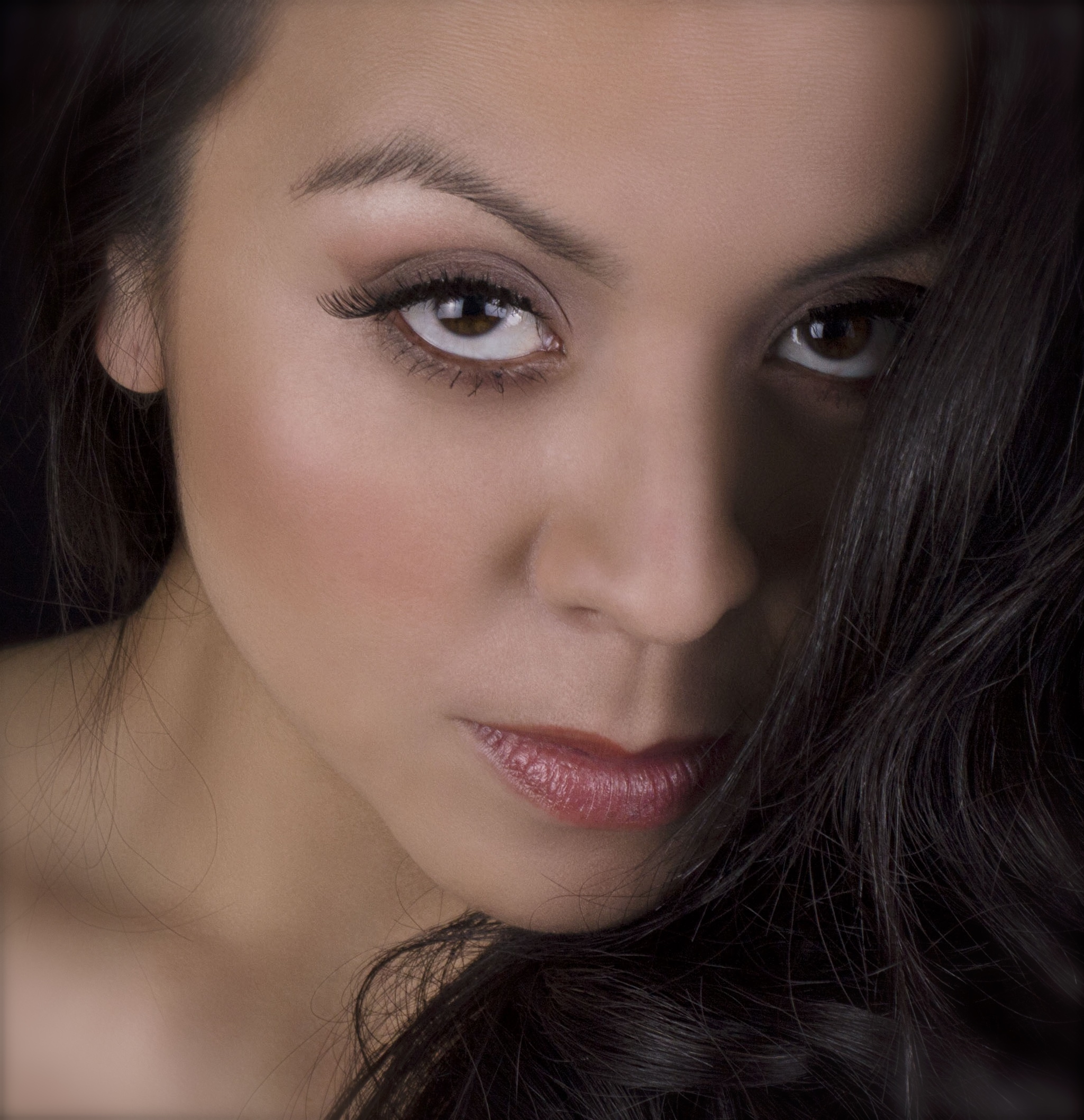
Alejandra Flores

Emilda María Alejandra Flores García (born 1986, Guatemala City) is a Guatemalan soprano.

== Early life ==
She studied Dramatic Arts' at the Superior School of Arts at San Carlos University in Guatemala. She took music lessons with Zoila Luz García Salas (National Conservatory of Guatemala City) and lyric technique with Luis Felipe Girón May (Guatemala), Gustavo Manzitti (Colón Theater Superior Institute of Art, Buenos Aires, Argentina) and Amy Pfrimmer (Tulane University, New Orleans, United States). She refined her vocal and interpretative technique with Massimo Pezzutti (Italy).

== Career ==
She participated in theater plays, opera, and concerts and sang in Central America, South America, and the United States. In Guatemala, she performed on the most important stages of the country: Grand Hall of the National Theater, Chamber Theater "Hugo Carrillo", the Municipal Theater of Quetzaltenango, National Music Conservatory "Germán Alcántara", Auditorium Juan Bautista Gutiérrez, Auditorium Mariano Gálvez, Auditorium of the Universidad del Valle, Auditorium Alejandro von Humboldt, Abril Theater, Solo Theater and Dick Smith Theater.

She participated in the first performance of the lyric opera Il Duce by Federico García Vigil, playing the role of Rachele (Mussolini's wife) at the Solís Theatre in Montevideo (Uruguay). She sang in Rigoletto by Giuseppe Verdi at the Jefferson Performing Arts Center and in several concerts for the Jefferson Performing Arts Society (New Orleans, Louisiana, United States). She was the guest of honor at La Casona de la Ópera in San José, Costa Rica. She was accompanied by major musicians such as Andrea Bacchetti, Gianfranco Bortolato and Massimiliano Damerini.

== Recognition ==
- Gold Medal at The World Championships of Performing Arts in Los Angeles, California
- Arco Iris Maya Trophy for best young voice (Guatemala)
- Artist Award of the Year 2004 as Opera Revelation Artist (Guatemala)
- Acknowledgment Diploma for her "High Artistic Quality and Lyric Art Contribution" (Guatemalan Ministry of Culture and General Direction of the Arts)
- Artist Award of the Year 2014 for Artistic Career in Belcanto (Guatemala)
- Distinguished Visitor Diploma of the City of Quetzaltenango (Guatemala) for her artistic labor and cultural collaboration
- First Prize at the First Central America Opera Competition – Concecali 2016, San José (Costa Rica)

== Gallery ==
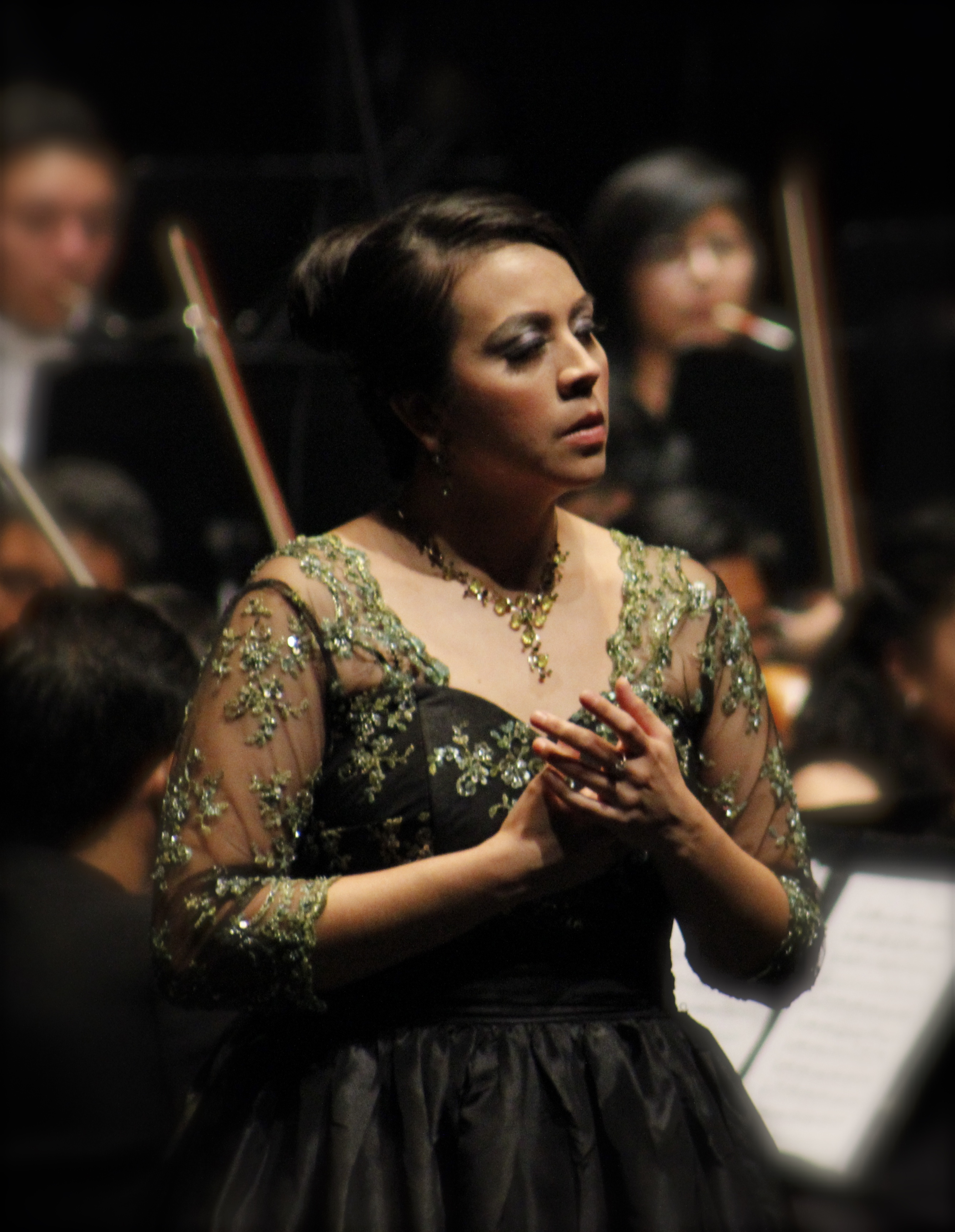
Concert at the Guatemalan National Theater

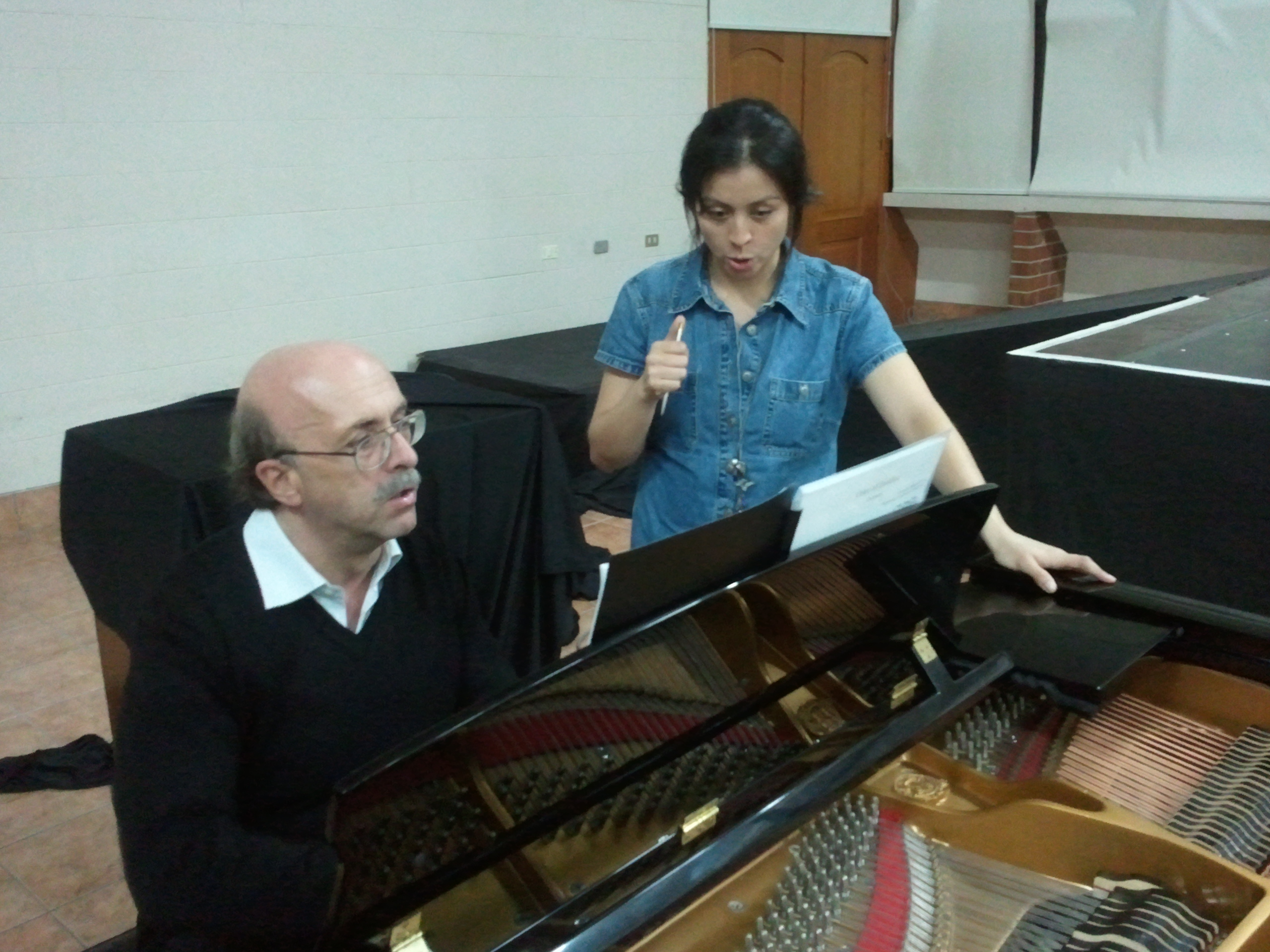
Working with the conductor Guido Maria Guida (it)

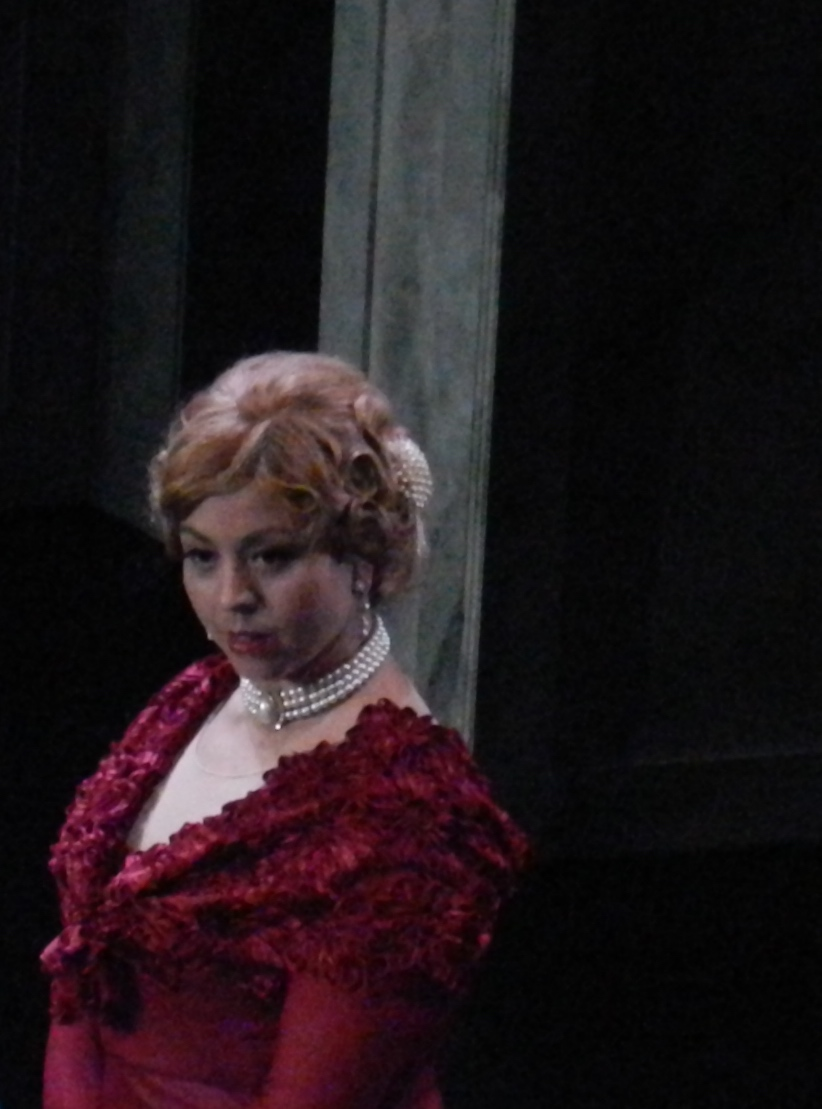
As Rachele from the opera Il Duce at Teatro Solís of Montevideo

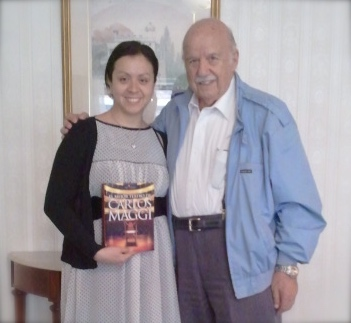
With playwright Carlos Maggi, Il Duce's librettist

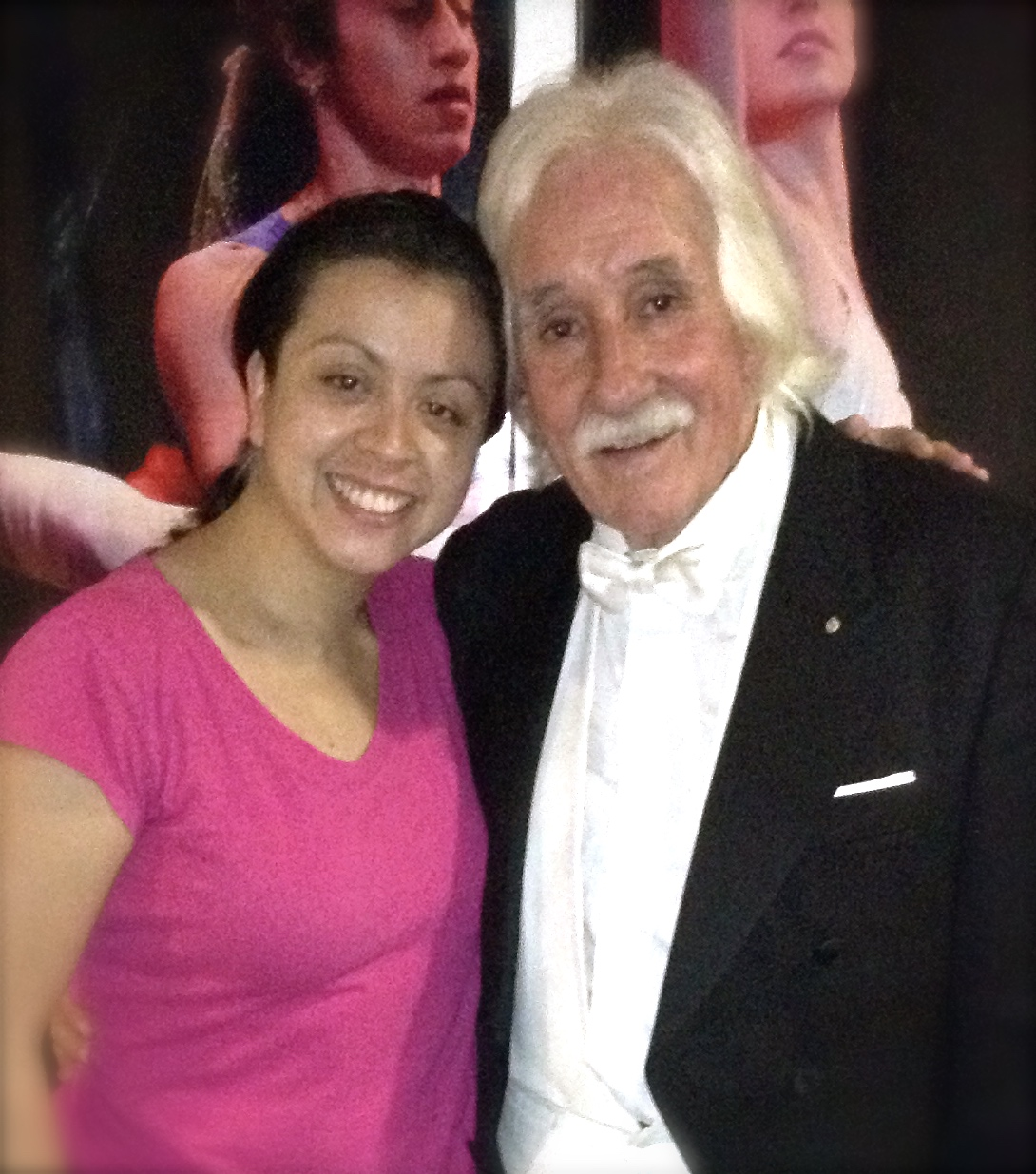
With Federico García Vigil, at the end of the performance

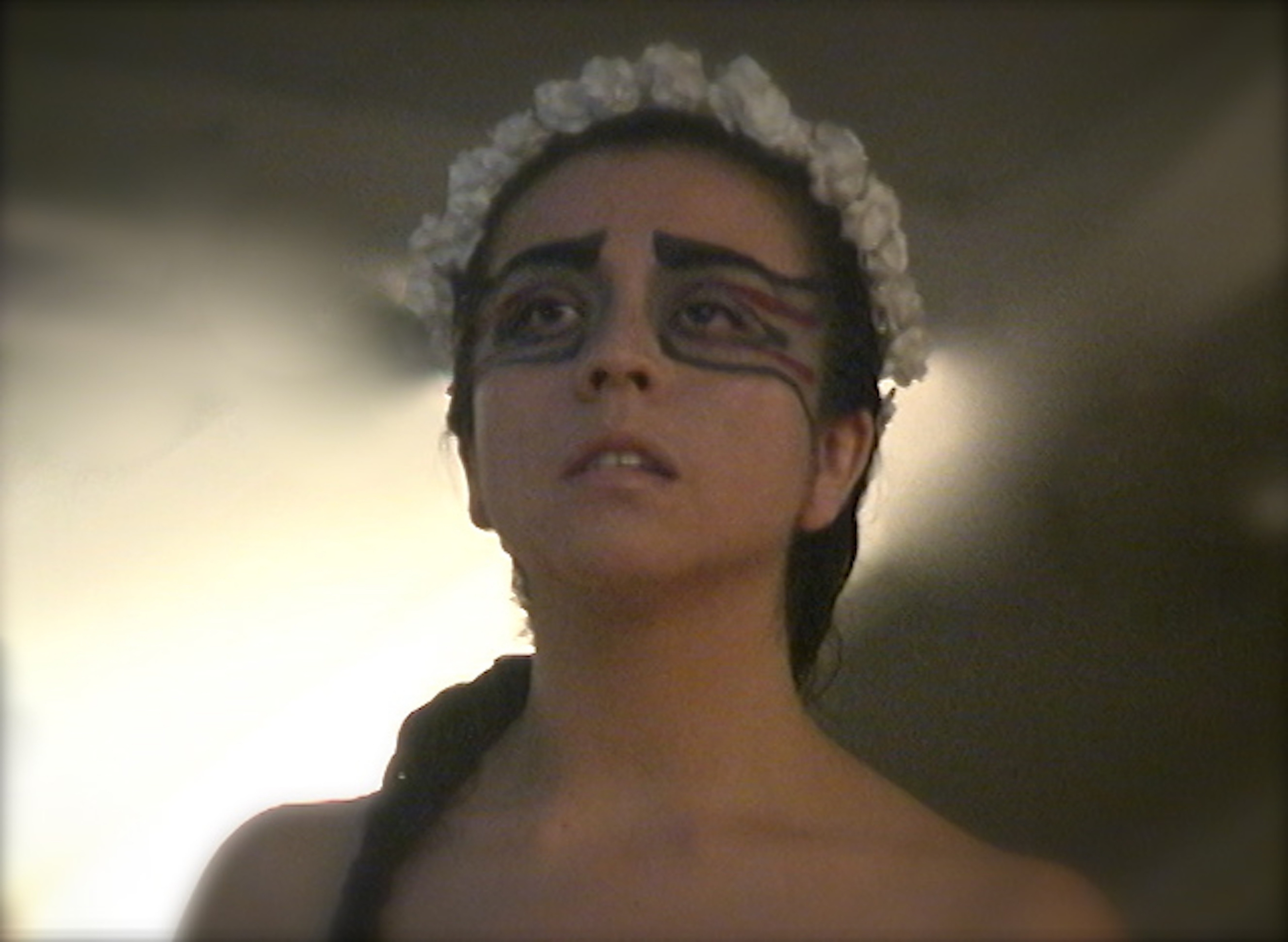
As Euridice (Gluck)

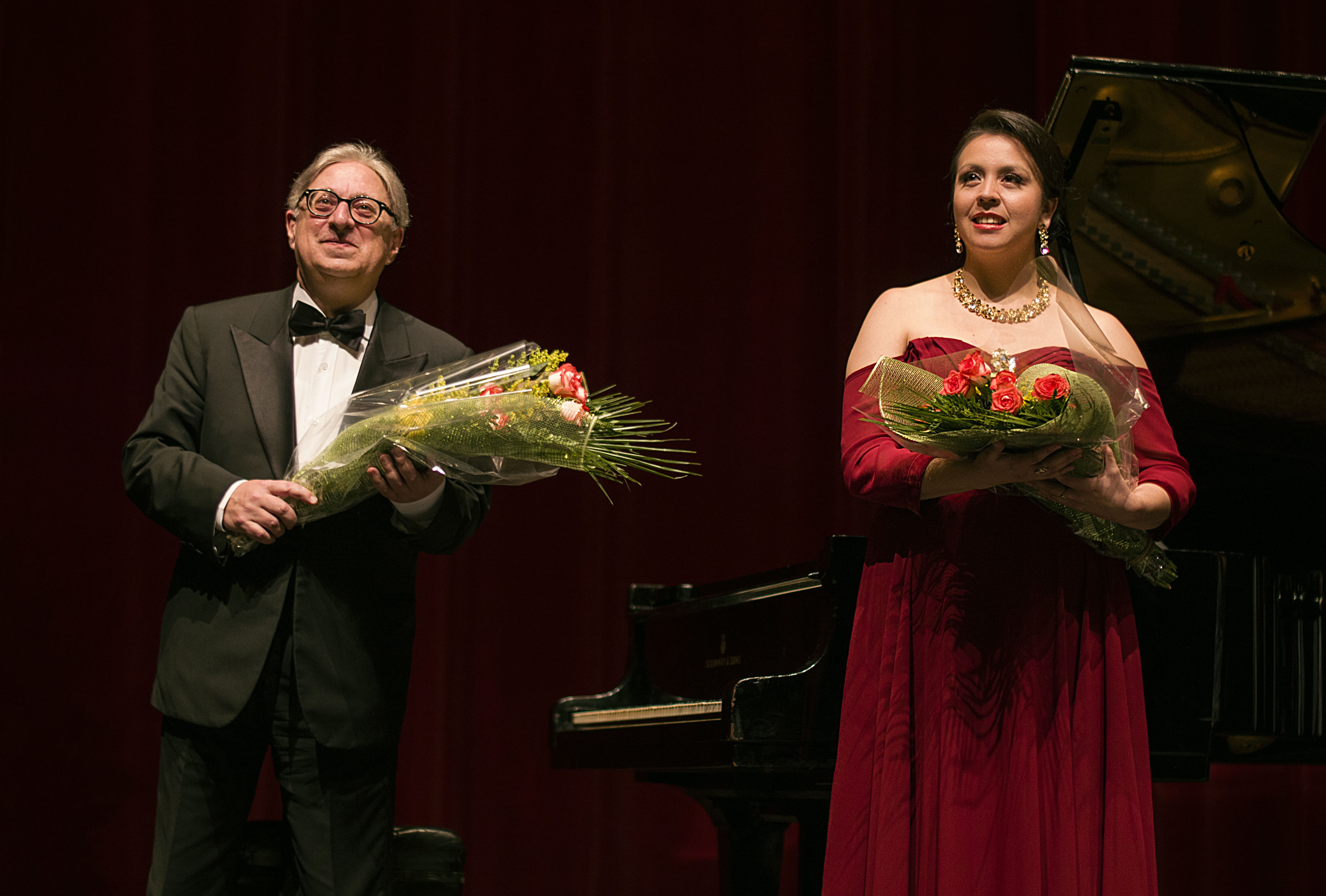
Flores' and Massimiliano Damerini's concert

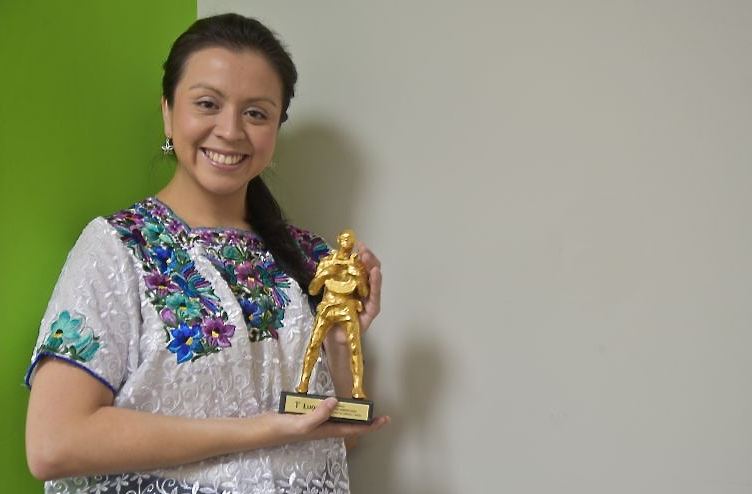
With the Gold Orpheus (Costa Rica, 2016)

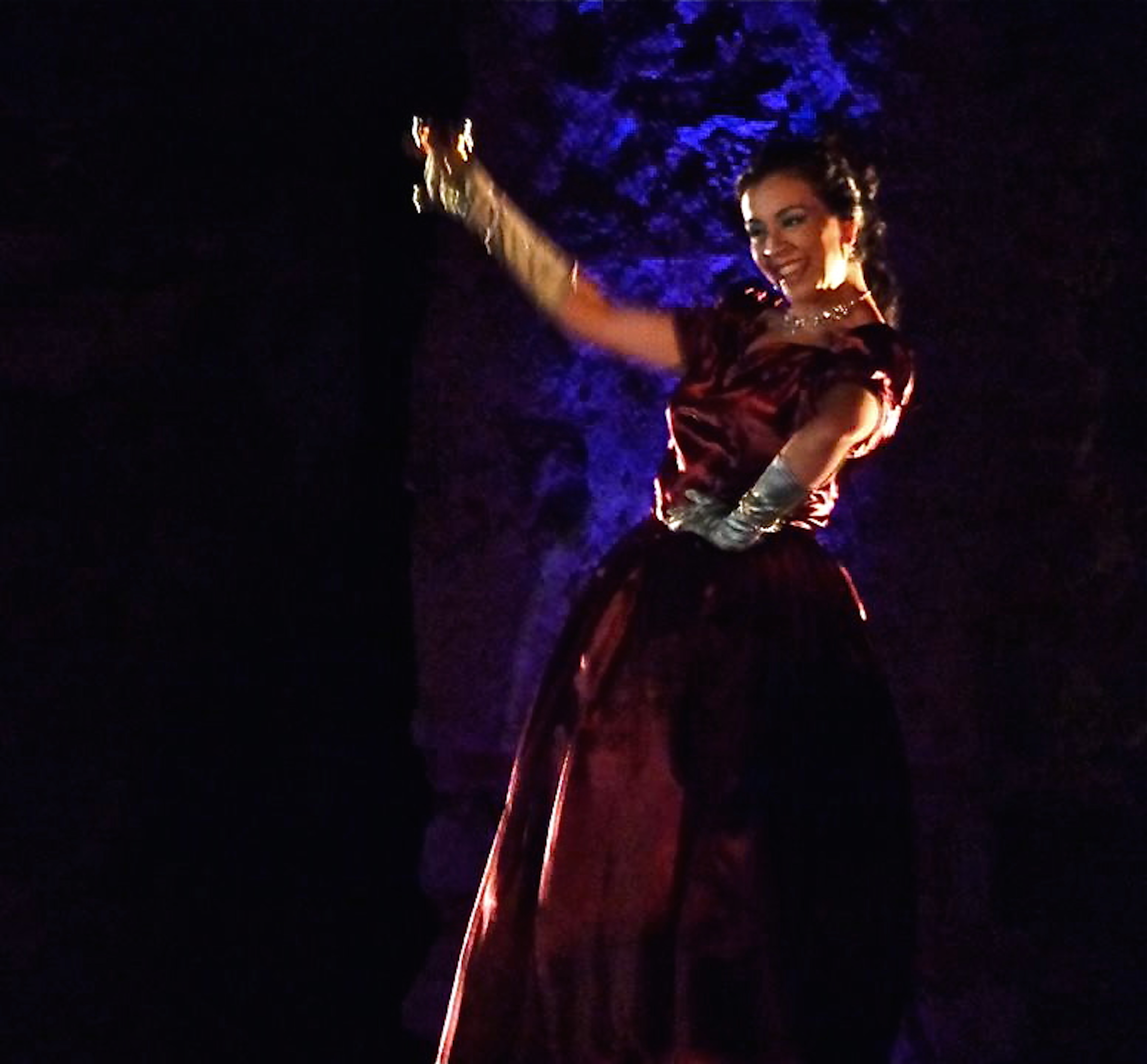
As Adele from Die Fledermaus

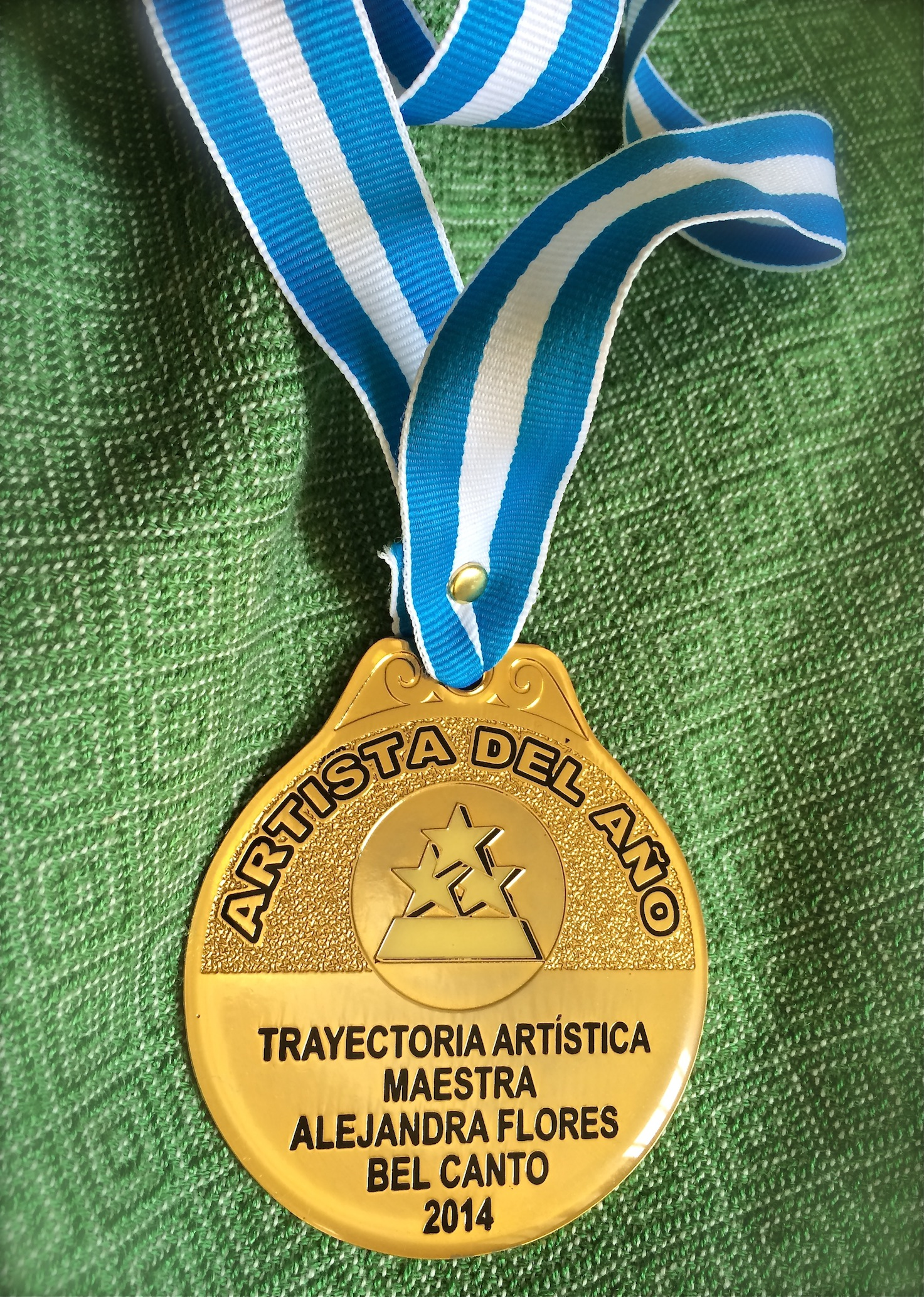
Artist Award of the Year 2014

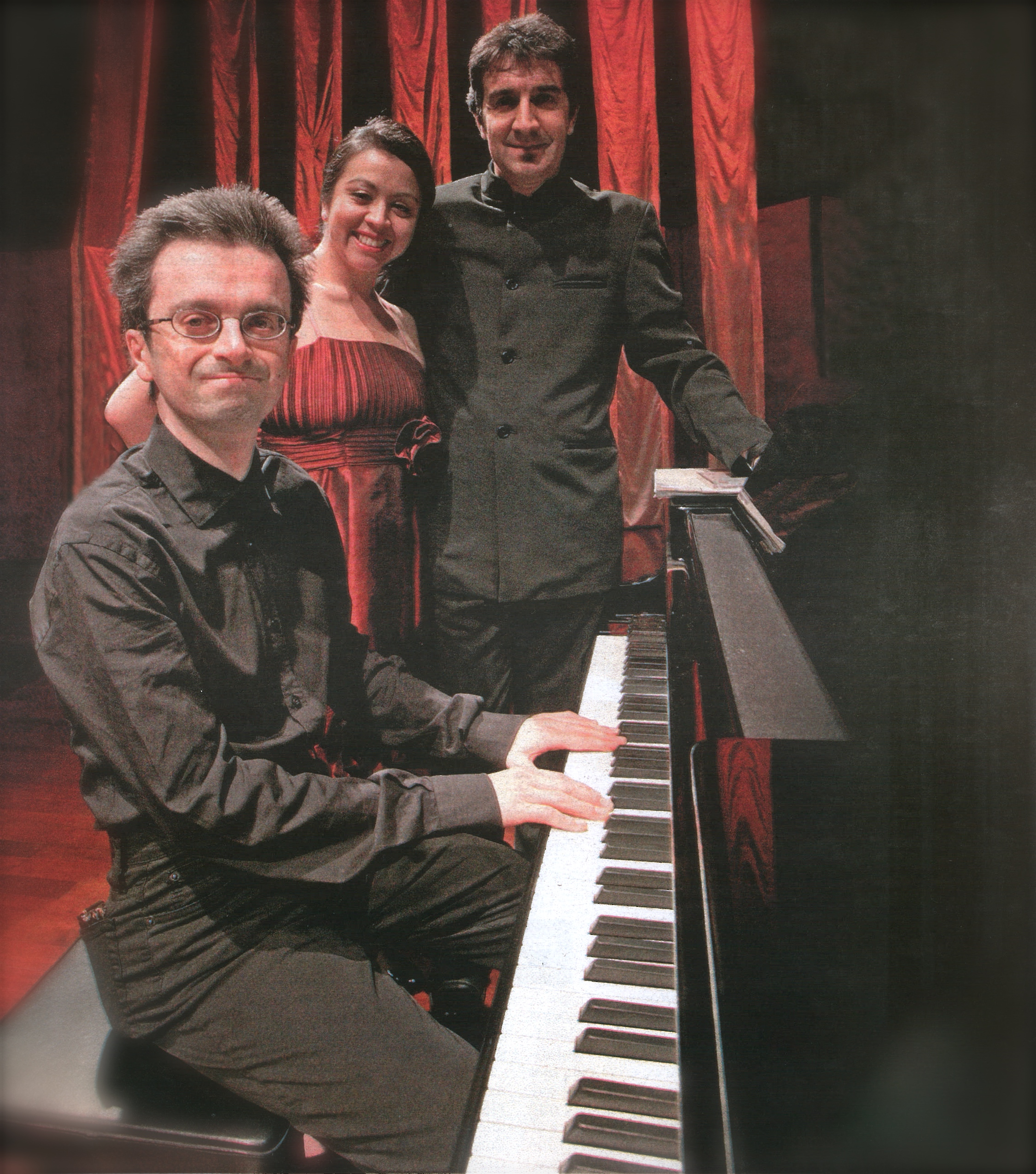
Concert with Gianfranco Bortolato (oboe) and Andrea Bacchetti (piano)

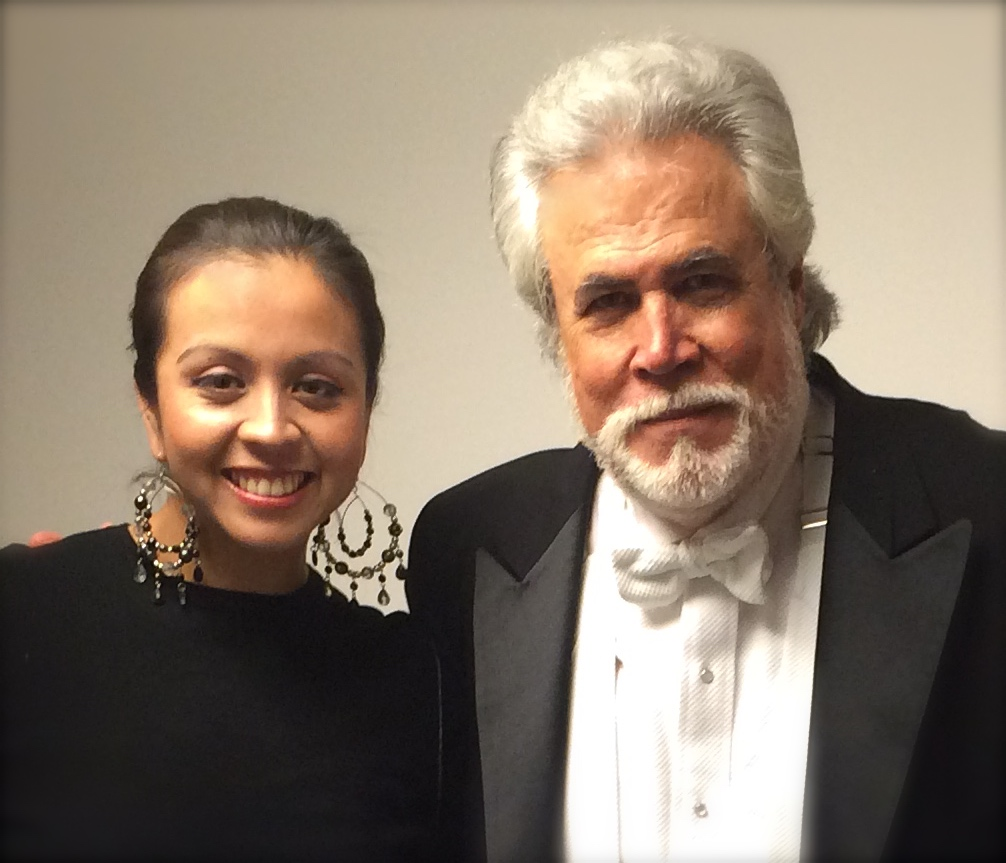
At the concert in the JPAC, with the conductor Dennis Assaf
