= Franz Galich =

Guatemalan writer

Franz Galich Mazariegos
- Born: Franz Galich Mazariegos; 8 January 1951 Amatitlán, Guatemala
- Died: 3 February 2007 (aged 56) Managua, Nicaragua
- Occupation: Writer, dramatist, literature professor
- Language: Spanish
- Genre: Novel, short story, drama
- Notable works: Managua Salsa City (¡Devórame otra vez!); Huracán corazón del cielo; Y te diré quién eres (Mariposa traicionera)
- Notable awards: Rogelio Sinán Novel Prize

Franz Galich Mazariegos (8 January 1951, Amatitlán, Guatemala – 3 February 2007, Managua, Nicaragua) was a Guatemalan writer, dramatist, and literature professor whose work focused on Central America and was characterised by satire, urban language, and depictions of marginalised communities. Although born in Guatemala, he spent much of his adult life in exile in Nicaragua, where he developed a significant part of his literary career.

== Early life and education ==
Galich was born in Amatitlán, Guatemala, into a politically prominent family. His father, Luis Galich, served as mayor of the city. His early interest in literature was influenced by his uncle Manuel Galich, a well-known intellectual and political figure in Central America. He attended Colegio Don Bosco in Guatemala City, where he began writing short fiction for the school newspaper.

After completing secondary education, Galich enrolled at the University of San Carlos of Guatemala, initially studying agronomy before transferring to the Faculty of Humanities to pursue literature. His academic formation took place during a period of political repression in Guatemala, which limited cultural expression and strongly influenced his social and political awareness.

== Early writing and exile ==
Between 1979 and 1980, Galich published his first book, Ficcionario inédito, a collection of short stories centred on everyday life in Amatitlán. The work gained attention for its dark tone, particularly the story El ratero, which portrayed urban marginality and social tension in Guatemala.

During the same period, Galich combined his literary activity with political activism against the government of President Fernando Romeo Lucas García. After facing threats to his life, he sought asylum abroad in 1980. Following a brief stay in Mexico, he went into exile in Nicaragua, where he would reside permanently and continue his literary and academic career.

== Literary career ==
Critics often distinguish two major phases in Galich’s work: an early phase focused on Guatemalan settings and a later phase shaped by his experience in Nicaragua and the broader Central American region. His writing increasingly incorporated colloquial language and satire to depict postwar societies marked by violence, corruption, and social exclusion.

Among his most notable works is the novel Managua Salsa City (¡Devórame otra vez!), published in 1999, which won the Central American Rogelio Sinán Novel Prize. The novel is regarded as a major contribution to contemporary Central American literature for its experimental style and portrayal of urban life in Managua.

His later novel Y te diré quién eres (Mariposa traicionera), published in 2006, further developed these themes and formed part of a planned narrative cycle set in Central America. Galich also left an unfinished novel, Tikal futura: Memorias para un futuro incierto, which was published posthumously and analysed as a work blending political fiction, dystopian elements, and social critique.

== Academic career ==
In Nicaragua, Galich worked as a professor of literature at several institutions, including the National Autonomous University of Nicaragua, the Central American University, the Polytechnic University of Nicaragua, and the National School of Fine Arts. He also founded the magazines El Ángel and Istmo.

== Death ==
Galich died on 3 February 2007 at the Roberto Dávila Bolaños Military Hospital in Managua after a prolonged illness. His death was widely mourned by writers and academics in Guatemala and Nicaragua, who described his passing as a significant loss for Central American literature.

== Legacy ==
His literary legacy is associated with the use of innovative urban language and satire to represent marginalised communities and explore the social consequences of war, inequality, and corruption in postwar Central America.

== Works ==
Novels

- Huracán corazón del cielo, 1995 (Lit. Hurricane heart of the sky)
- Managua Salsa City, 1999 (Salsa Managua City)
- En Este Mundo Matraca, 2005 (In This World, Rattle)
- Y te diré quién eres, 2006 (And I'll Tell You Who You Are)

Short Story

- Ficcionario inédito, 1979 (Ficcionario Unpublished)
- La Princesa de Onix y otros relatos, 1989 (The Princess of Onix and other stories)
- El Ratero y otros relatos, 2003 (The Thief and Other Stories)
