= Guatemalans =

People of Guatemala

Guatemalans Guatemaltecos
- Flag of Guatemala

Total population
- 19,357,426; Guatemala 17,980,803

Regions with significant populations
- United States: 1,226,849
- Mexico: 46,318
- Belize: 26,767
- Canada: 18,602
- Spain: 10,002 – 15,172 (2022)
- El Salvador: 9,036
- Honduras: 4,711
- France: 3,423
- Costa Rica: 3,192
- Italy: 2,330 – 965 (according to Italian official data)
- Germany: 2,322
- Brazil: 1,997
- Panama: 1,925
- Nicaragua: 1,843
- Switzerland: 1,144

Languages
- Spanish, English, 24 indigenous linguistic groups of Amerindian languages

Religion
- Catholic and Protestant, Indigenous Amerindian religion

Guatemalans (Spanish: guatemaltecos or less commonly guatemalenses) are people connected to the country of Guatemala. This connection may be residential, legal, historical or cultural. For most Guatemalans, several (if not all) of these connections exist.

Guatemala is a multicultural society, though most Guatemalans have varying degrees of European (predominantly Spaniard) and Amerindian ancestry. Guatemalans are also colloquially nicknamed chapines in other Spanish-speaking countries of Latin America.

== Demographics ==
Ethnicities of Guatemalans (2018)
Ancestry
Ladino^{a}	56.01%
Mayan	41.66%
Xinca	1.77%
Black	0.32%
Other	0.24%
^{a} Mestizo or hispanicized people

Guatemala has a population of 17,153,288 (July 2020 est). In 1900, Guatemala had a population of 885,000. Guatemala had the fastest population growth in the Western Hemisphere during 20th century. Approximately half of the Guatemalan population lives in poverty and 13.7% of them live in extreme poverty.

Guatemala is heavily centralized. Transportation, communications, business, politics, and the most relevant urban activity takes place in Guatemala City. Guatemala City has about 2 million inhabitants within the city limits and more than 5 million within the wider urban area. This is a significant percentage of the population (14 million).

The estimated median age in Guatemala is 20 years old, 19.4 for males and 20.7 years for females. This is the lowest median age of any country in the Western Hemisphere and comparable to most of central Africa and Iraq.

=== Ethnic groups ===
According to the 2018 Census, about 56.57% of the population identifies as non-indigenous. The majority, or 56.01% are Ladinos, those include Mestizos, people mixed European with Amerindian, another part but visible are Whites of European descent, specially Spanish, German and Italian, (in Colonia Era, direct descendants of Spanish were called as Criollo). The Amerindian populations as of 2002 Census include the K'iche' 9.1%, Q'eqchi 8.4%, Kaqchikel 7.9%, Mam 6.3% and 8.6% of the population is "other Mayan", 0.4% is indigenous non-Mayan, making the indigenous community in Guatemala about 40.3% of the population.

There are smaller communities present, including about 15,000 Salvadorans. The Garífuna, who are descended primarily from Africans who lived with and intermarried with indigenous peoples from St. Vincent, live mainly in Livingston and Puerto Barrios. Those communities have other blacks and mulattos descended from the Spanish Slave Trade. There are also Asians, mostly of Chinese descent. Other Asian groups include Arabs of Lebanese and Syrian descent. There is also a growing Korean community in Guatemala City and in nearby Mixco, currently numbering about 6,000. Guatemala's German population is credited with bringing the tradition of a Christmas tree to the country.

==== Mestizo ====
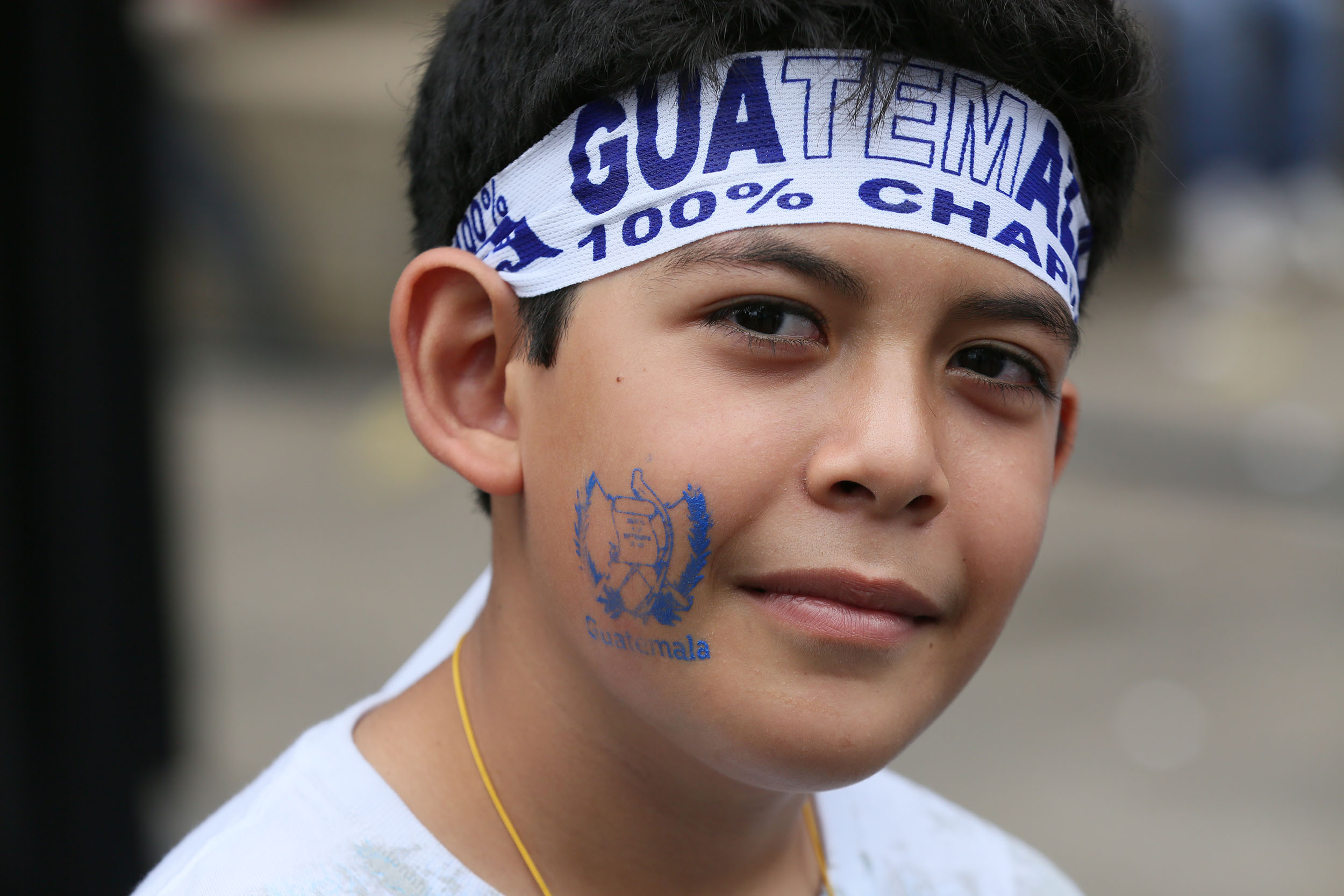
Child in Guatemala City celebrating Independence Day.

Guatemalan mestizos are people of mixed European and Amerindian ancestry. They may also have varying degrees of African or Asian ancestry. Mixed Guatemalans could reach 60% with people of different grades of mixture, but the culture environment into different communities can influence people to identify as Indigenous, Ladino or White. The mestizo population in Guatemala is concentrated in urban areas of the country (the national capital and departmental capitals), as well eastern parts of Guatemala and the mostly coastal department of Escuintla. Genetic testing indicates that Guatemalan Mestizos are on average of predominantly indigenous ancestry.

Historically the mestizo population in the Kingdom of Guatemala at the time of Independence amounted to nearly 600,000 Indians, 300,000 castes (mostly mestizos and a lesser number of mulattos), and 45,000 criollos or Spanish, with a very small number of Spaniards.

==== Indigenous ====
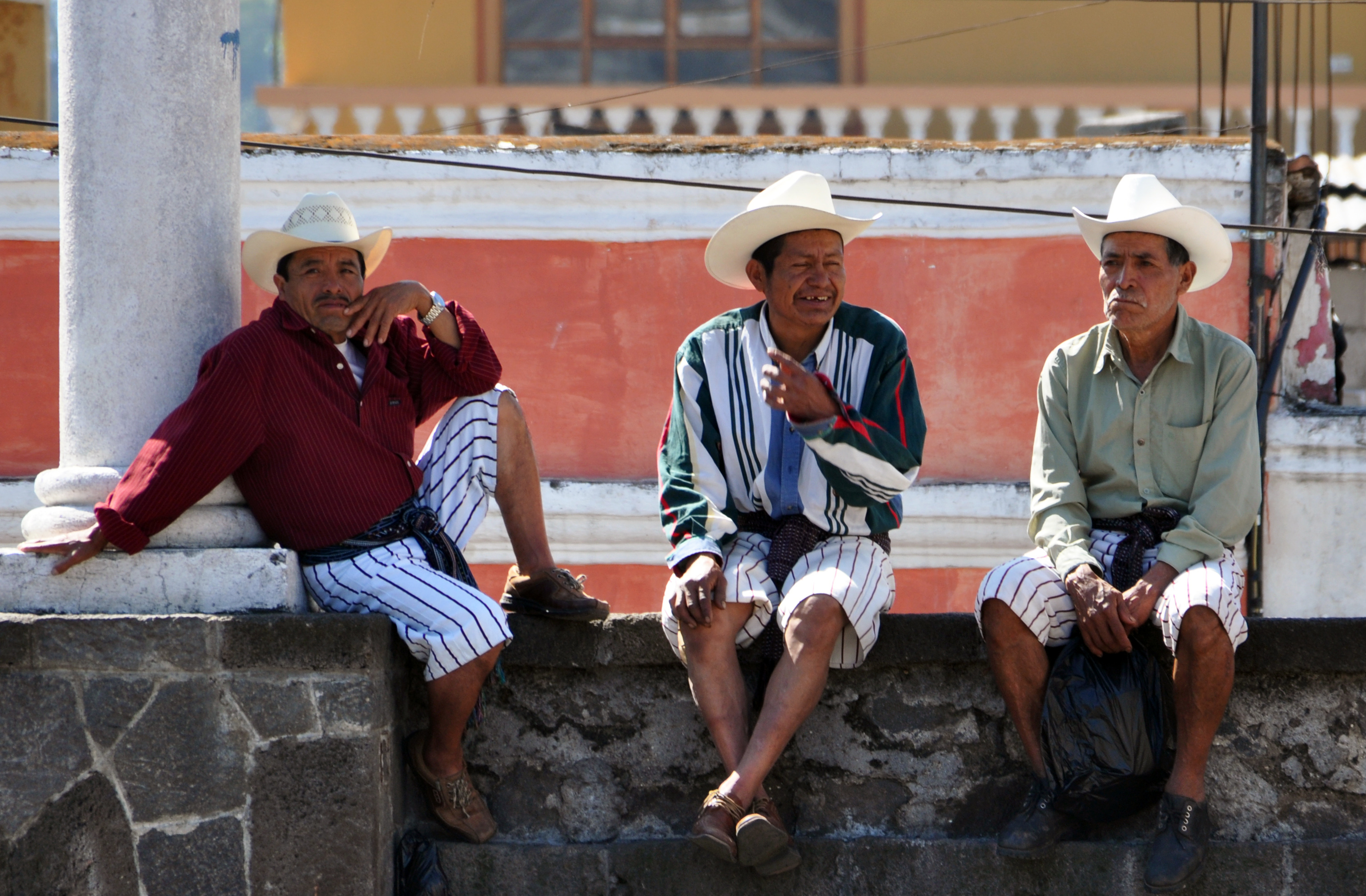
Tz'utujil men in Santiago Atitlán.

The Amerindian populations in Guatemala are estimated from 41.7% to the half of population. According to the last Census, the distribution are formed by K'iche' 9.1%, Kaqchikel 8.4%, Mam 7.9% and Q'eqchi 6.3%. 8.6% of the population is "other Mayan," 0.4% is indigenous non-Mayan, making the indigenous community in Guatemala about 40.3% of the population.

==== Garifuna ====
The Garífuna, who are descended primarily from Africans who lived with and intermarried with indigenous peoples from St. Vincent, live mainly in Livingston and Puerto Barrios.

==== Criollo and other European descendants ====
The term Criollo refers to Guatemalans of mostly or fully Spanish descent. Other European ethnic groups include those of Germans, Italians, English, and Belgian descent.

=== Languages ===
A language map of Guatemala. The "Castilian" areas represent Spanish.

Spanish is the official language. As a first and second language, Spanish is spoken by 93% of the population as second or third language.

Twenty-one Mayan languages are spoken, especially in rural areas, as well as two non-Mayan Amerindian languages, Xinca, an indigenous language, and Garifuna, an Arawakan language spoken on the Caribbean coast. According to the Language Law of 2003, the languages of Mayas, Xincas, and Garifunas are unrecognized as National Languages.

The peace accords signed in December 1996 provide for the translation of some official documents and voting materials into several indigenous languages (see summary of main substantive accords) and mandate the provision of interpreters in legal cases for non-Spanish speakers. The accord also sanctioned bilingual education in Spanish and indigenous languages. It is common for indigenous Guatemalans to learn or speak between two and five of the nation's other languages, and Spanish.

=== Emigration out of Guatemala ===
The Civil War forced many Guatemalans to start lives outside of their country. The majority of the Guatemalan diaspora is located in the United States of America, with estimates ranging from 480,665 to 1,489,426. The difficulty in getting accurate counts for Guatemalans abroad is because many of them are refugee claimants awaiting determination of their status. Emigration to the United States of America has led to the growth of Guatemalan communities in California, Delaware, Florida, Illinois, New York, New Jersey, Texas, Rhode Island and elsewhere since the 1970s.

Below are estimates for the total number of Guatemalans in certain countries:

Country	2020
United States	1,226,849
Mexico	46,318
Belize	26,767
Canada	18,602
Spain	10,002
El Salvador	9036
Honduras	4711
France	3423
Costa Rica	3192
Italy	2330
Total	1,368,431
Source:DatosMacro.

=== Immigration to Guatemala ===
During the colonial era Guatemala received immigrants (settlers) only from Spain. Subsequently, Guatemala received waves of immigration from Europe in the mid 19th century and early 20th century. Primarily from Germany, these immigrants installed coffee and cardamom fincas in Alta Verapaz, Zacapa, Quetzaltenango, Baja Verapaz and Izabal departments. To a lesser extent people also arrived from Spain, France, Belgium, England, Italy, Sweden, etc.

From the 1890s there have been small communities of Asians (in particular from Korea, China, Japan, Singapore and the Philippines) but in recent decades this has been growing. Also beginning with the First World War, the immigrant population is being strengthened by Jewish and Pakistani immigration.

During the second half of the twentieth century, Latin American immigration grew strong in Guatemala, particularly from other Central American countries, Mexico, Cuba, Colombia, etc. Although the majority of them resided only temporarily to go to their final destination, which was the United States.

Below are estimates for the total number of immigrants from other countries in Guatemala:

Country	2020
El Salvador	20,683
Mexico	18,872
United States	9299
Nicaragua	9211
Honduras	9023
South Korea	1921
Spain	1418
Costa Rica	1248
Colombia	1242
Belize	984
Total	84,311
Source:DatosMacro.

== Guatemalan culture ==
=== Cuisine ===
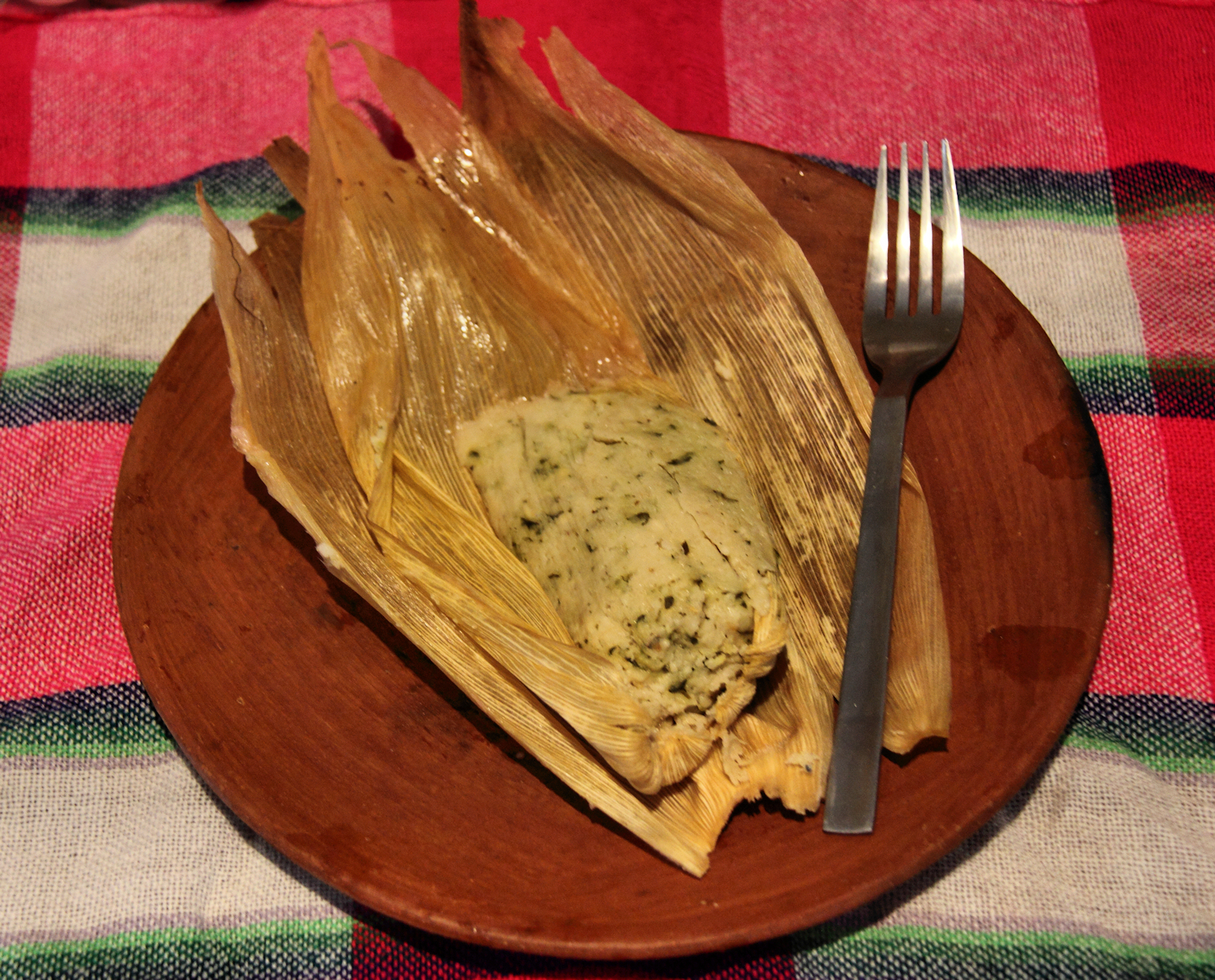
Chipilín Tamal, a common dish usually eaten at dinner

Guatemalan cuisine reflects the multicultural nature of Guatemala, in that it involves food that differs in taste depending on the region. Guatemala has 22 departments (or divisions), each of which has very different varieties of food.. For example, Antigua Guatemala is well known for its candy which makes use of many local ingredients fruits, seeds and nuts along with honey, condensed milk and other traditional sweeteners. Antigua's candy is very popular when tourists visit the country for the first time, and is a great choice in the search for new and interesting flavors.

Many traditional foods are based on Maya cuisine and prominently feature corn, chilis and beans as key ingredients. Various dishes may have the same name as dishes from a neighboring country, but may in fact be quite different for example the enchilada or quesadilla, which are nothing like their Mexican counterparts.

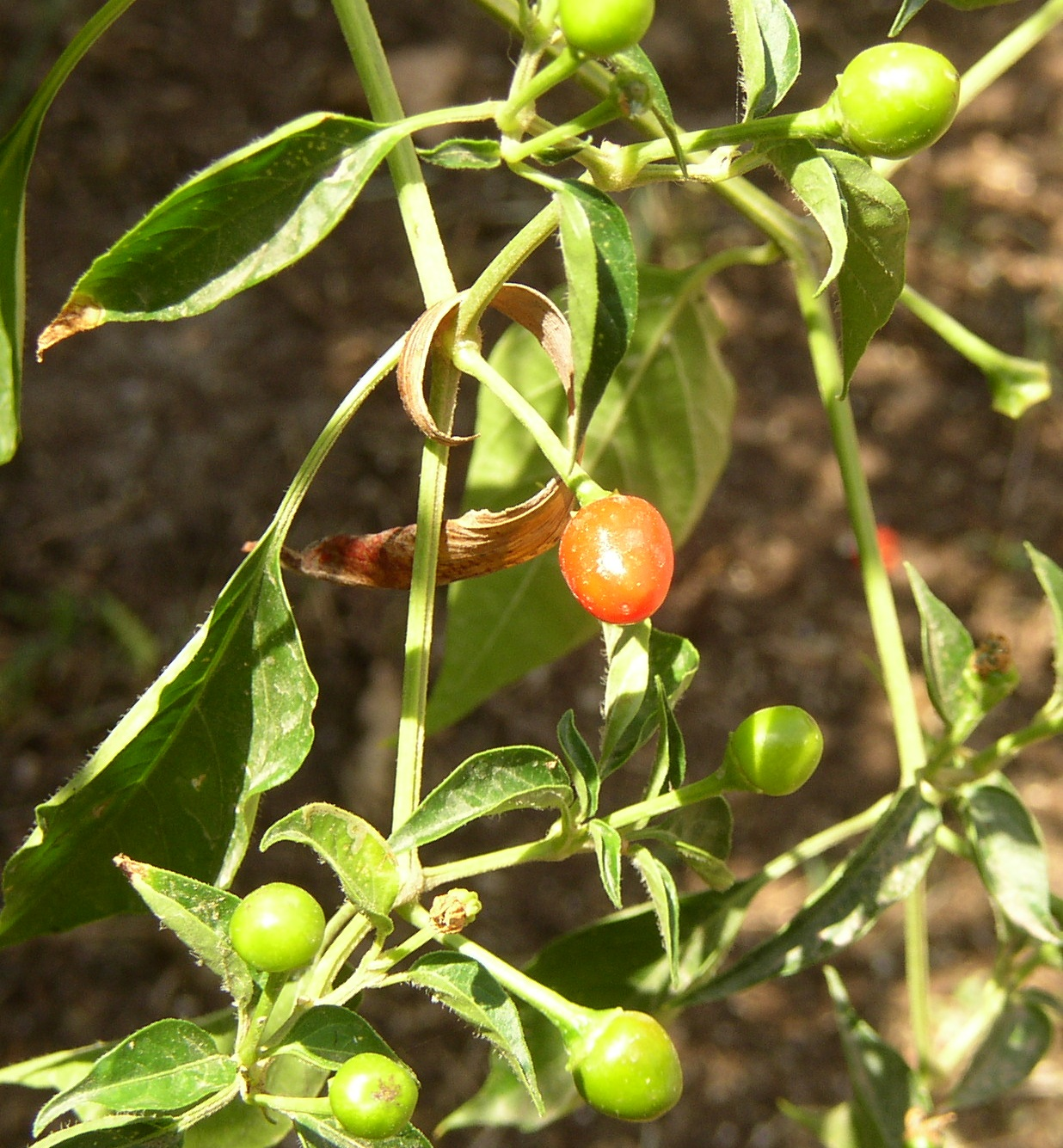
Chiltepe, a common pepper used on some Guatemalan dishes

There are also foods that it is traditional to eat on certain days of the week – for example, by tradition it is known that on Thursday, the typical food is "paches", which is like a tamale made with a base of potato, and on Sundays it is traditional to eat tamales, due to the fact that Sundays are considered holidays. Certain dishes are also associated with special occasions, such as fiambre for All Saints Day on November 1 and tamales, which are common Christmas.

There are reportedly hundreds of varieties of tamales throughout Guatemala. They key variations are what is in the masa or dough (maize, potatoes, rice), what's in the filling (meat, fruits, nuts), and what is it wrapped with (leaves, husks). The masa is made out of corn that is not sweet, such as what is known as feed corn in the U.S.A. In Guatemala, this non-sweet corn is called maize and the corn that Americans from the US are used to eating on the cob, sweet corn, they call elote. Tamales in Guatemala are more typically wrapped in plantain, banana, or maxan leaves rather than corn husks.

The ancient Mayan civilization lasted for about six hundred years before collapsing around 900 A.D. Today, almost half of the Guatemalan population is Mayan. These natives live throughout the country and grow maize as their staple crop. In addition, the ancient Maya ate amaranth, a breakfast cereal similar to modern day cereals.

=== Music ===
Guatemala's national instrument is the marimba, an idiophone from the family of the xylophones, which is played all over the country, even in the remotest corners. Towns also have wind and percussion bands that play during the Lent and Easter-week processions, as well as on other occasions. The Garifuna people of Afro-Caribbean descent, who are spread thinly on the northeastern Caribbean coast, have their own distinct varieties of popular and folk music. Cumbia, from the Colombian variety, is also very popular, especially among the lower classes.

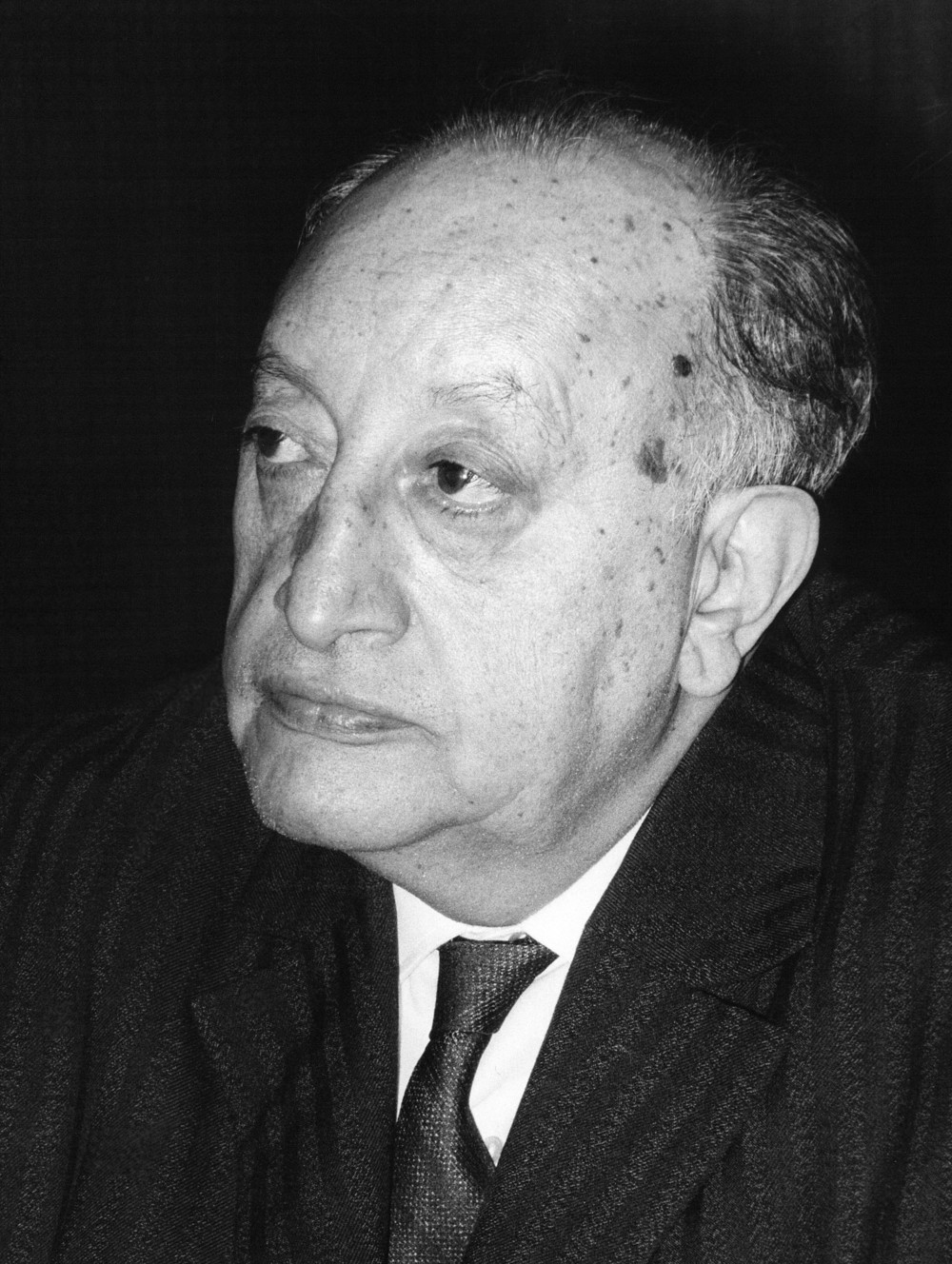
Miguel Ángel Asturias.

=== Literature ===
The Guatemala National Prize in Literature is a one-time only award that recognizes an individual writer's body of work. It has been given annually since 1988 by the Ministry of Culture and Sports.

Miguel Ángel Asturias won the literature Nobel Prize in 1967. Among his famous books is El Señor Presidente, a novel based on the government of Manuel Estrada Cabrera.

Rigoberta Menchú, winner of the Nobel Peace Prize for fighting oppression of indigenous people in Guatemala, is famous for her books I, Rigoberta Menchú and Crossing Borders.

=== Religion ===
Religion in Guatemala (2001)
1. Roman Catholicism (58.0%)
2. Christian Protestant (25.0%)
3. Atheist, None or Agnostic (14.0%)
4. Other Beliefs (3.00%)

Historically, Catholicism was introduced by the Spanish and was the official religion during the colonial era. However, the practice of Protestantism has increased markedly in recent decades, with nearly one third of Guatemalans identifying themselves as Protestants, chiefly Evangelicals and Pentecostals. Growth is particularly strong among the ethnic Mayan population, with National Evangelical Presbyterian Church of Guatemala being an important denomination, maintaining 11 indigenous-language Presbyteries.

Traditional Mayan religion persists through the process of inculturation, whereby certain practices are incorporated into Catholic ceremonies and worship when they are sympathetic to the meaning of Catholic belief. Indigenous religious practices are increasing as a result of the cultural protections established under the peace accords. The government has instituted a policy of providing altars at every Mayan ruin found in the country, so traditional ceremonies may be performed there.

== See also ==
- List of Guatemalans
- Guatemalan Americans
- Criollo people
- Hispanics
