= Kevin Ryan =

Kevin Ryan may refer to:

== Politicians ==
- Kevin J. Ryan (1969–2018), member of the New Jersey General Assembly
- Kevin Ryan (politician) (1952–2025), member of the Connecticut House of Representatives

== Sports ==
- Kevin Ryan (runner) (born 1949), long-distance runner from New Zealand
- Kevin Ryan (runner, born 1957), American middle-distance runner, All-American for the Bowling Green Falcons track and field team
- Kevin Ryan (Australian rules footballer) (1937–1999), Australian rules footballer
- Kevin Ryan (hurler) (born 1965), Irish hurling manager and former player
- Kevin Ryan (rugby) (born 1934), Australian sportsman, lawyer and politician

== Other people ==
- Kevin Ryan (actor) (born 1984), Irish-born film and television actor
- Kevin Ryan (charity executive) (born 1967), president and CEO of the charity Covenant House International
- Kevin A. Ryan (born 1932), founder and director emeritus of the Center for the Advancement of Ethics and Character at Boston University
- Kevin P. Ryan, American entrepreneur, founder and CEO of Gilt Groupe, and former DoubleClick CEO
- Kevin V. Ryan (born 1957), American attorney, former U.S. Attorney for the Northern District of California
- Kevin Ryan (science fiction author), American author of Star Trek novels

== Characters ==
- Kevin Ryan (Castle), from the American TV show Castle
