= Child sexual abuse in New York City religious institutions =

Child sexual abuse in New York City religious institutions has presaged or echoed that which has occurred and emerged elsewhere in the United States and Europe. The child sexual abuse cases documented here, so far, reach back to the 1970s but have mostly come to light since 1990.

This is a listing, and account, of notable cases; it is not necessarily a complete listing for New York City:

== Two 2011 basketball-program cases ==
Two cases in 2011 – those of Bob Oliva and Ernie Lorch – have both centered in highly ranked NYC youth basketball programs sponsored by churches of different denominations. Both cases have also moved to a criminal stage due to actions which have been alleged to, or admitted to, have happened in Massachusetts. As with many abuse cases, the fairly recent accusations addressed events which happened many years ago. However, Massachusetts law froze the statute of limitations when the victims left that state and allowed the cases, thence, to be brought many years later. In the open case – Lorch's – the statute of limitations provision is being challenged in court.

=== Bob Oliva ===
In early 2011, long-time basketball coach at Christ the King Regional High School Bob Oliva was accused of two cases of child sexual abuse. He pleaded guilty to one of the charges, brought in Massachusetts on behalf of a former student. Under the conditions of Oliva's plea bargain, he was permanently banned from coaching, and sentenced to five years' probation, during which he was mandated to wear a monitoring device to track his movements. Oliva molested the victim in the Massachusetts case, a family friend, during a trip to Massachusetts in 1976, when the boy was 14. A news report a year after the conviction said that the victim in the case had been "deeply moved by the number of people who offered him support when Oliva and Christ the King officials were dismissing him as a shakedown artist. 'I realized I have real friends'", he said. "Suffolk Superior Court Judge Carol Ball hugged [him] and told him it was one of the greatest victim statement's she's ever heard," the report added.

In a related action, the victim in the Massachusetts case has a civil action for $20 million against Oliva. In February 2012, the Queens judge refused Oliva's motion to dismiss the case, so trial was expected later in the year.

=== Ernie Lorch ===
Ernie Lorch, a Middlebury College basketball player, was from 1961 the founding coach of the Riverside Hawks youth basketball team sponsored by the Riverside Church. The church is interdenominational (American Baptist and United Church of Christ) and located on the Upper West Side. Lorch resigned after charges of child sexual abuse were leveled and District Attorney Robert M. Morgenthau began investigating in 2002.

Under the "frozen statute of limitations" provision, Lorch was arrested by a fugitive task force in 2010 at a convalescent home in Ardsley, New York, said U.S. Marshal Daniel Spellacy in Springfield, Massachusetts. Lorch was "accused of sexually abusing the then-17-year-old victim when his Riverside Hawks team traveled from Manhattan to the University of Massachusetts in Amherst for a tournament between March 1977 and April 1978. Lorch also tried to rape the player, the indictment said." As of March, 2011 Lorch's attorney was asserting his client suffered from dementia and diabetes and required a wheelchair; and the lawyer was effecting other efforts to prevent extradition, including habeas corpus and a challenge to the "frozen statute of limitations" provision. Several New York men told the Daily News after the 2010 arrest "that they had been paid into the millions of dollars to remain silent about alleged abuse".

Lorch successfully resisted extradition in November 2011, but died in May 2012.

== Satmar Hasidic and Haredi communities ==
Brooklyn is home to the largest Haredi community outside Israel. Haredim make up about a quarter million of New York City's population, and most of them live in Brooklyn. According to scholars, the rate of sex abuse within Haredi communities is roughly the same as anywhere else. In many abuse cases, though, victims have not come forward with accusations because of stigmatization from the community, and when they did come forward, the matter generally stayed within the community rather than being reported to the police and forming part of crime statistics. Sexual abuse within the community is often not reported to police. Rather than reporting to police, Haredim may take a case of sexual abuse to the shomrim, a local Jewish street patrol. The shomrim keep the names of suspected child molesters on file, but do not share them with law enforcement or take other measures to end abuse, and sometimes also try to discourage people from taking a case to the police.

Many feel that to report a Jew to non-Jewish authorities constitutes the religious crime of mesirah. Samuel Heilman, a professor of Jewish studies at Queens College, says that telling outside police would betray the Jewish community. Agudath Israel of America, an ultra-Orthodox organization, has stated that observant Jews should not report allegations to law enforcement without first consulting with a rabbi. However, other rabbis, including a Chabad-Lubavitch rabbinic court in Crown Heights and Yosef Blau, disagree and encourage reporting abusers to police, stating that the ban on mesirah does not apply.

== Other notable cases ==
=== Bruce Ritter, Covenant House ===
Father Bruce Ritter, founder of Covenant House in Manhattan, was forced to resign in 1990 after accusations that he had engaged in financial improprieties and had engaged in sexual relations with several youth in the care of the charity.

=== Yeshiva University high school ===
In December 2012, the President of the Orthodox Jewish Yeshiva University apologized over allegations that two rabbis at the college's high school campus abused boys there in the late 1970s and early ’80s. A later December report in The Forward focused on one Yeshiva University High School for Boys official, Rabbi George Finkelstein, and spoke "to 14 men who sa[id] that Finkelstein abused them while he was employed at [YUHSB] ... from 1968 to 1995". The report also concluded that YU and the governing Orthodox Rabbinical Council of America had known about accusations against Finkelstein for a decade or longer. In addition, "[f]rom the mid 1980s until today ... Y.U. officials and RCA rabbis have dismissed claims or kept them quiet" as Finkelstein went on to be dean of a Florida day school and then to the Jerusalem Great Synagogue. In July 2013, Chancellor Norman Lamm announced his retirement after more than 60 years at the University, and apologized for not responding more assertively when students at Yeshiva University High School for Boys said that two rabbis there had sexually abused them.

== See also ==
- Hush (novel)
- Religious abuse
- Sexual abuse
- Sexual misconduct
- Spiritual abuse
