= Margarita Azurdia =

Guatemalan artist

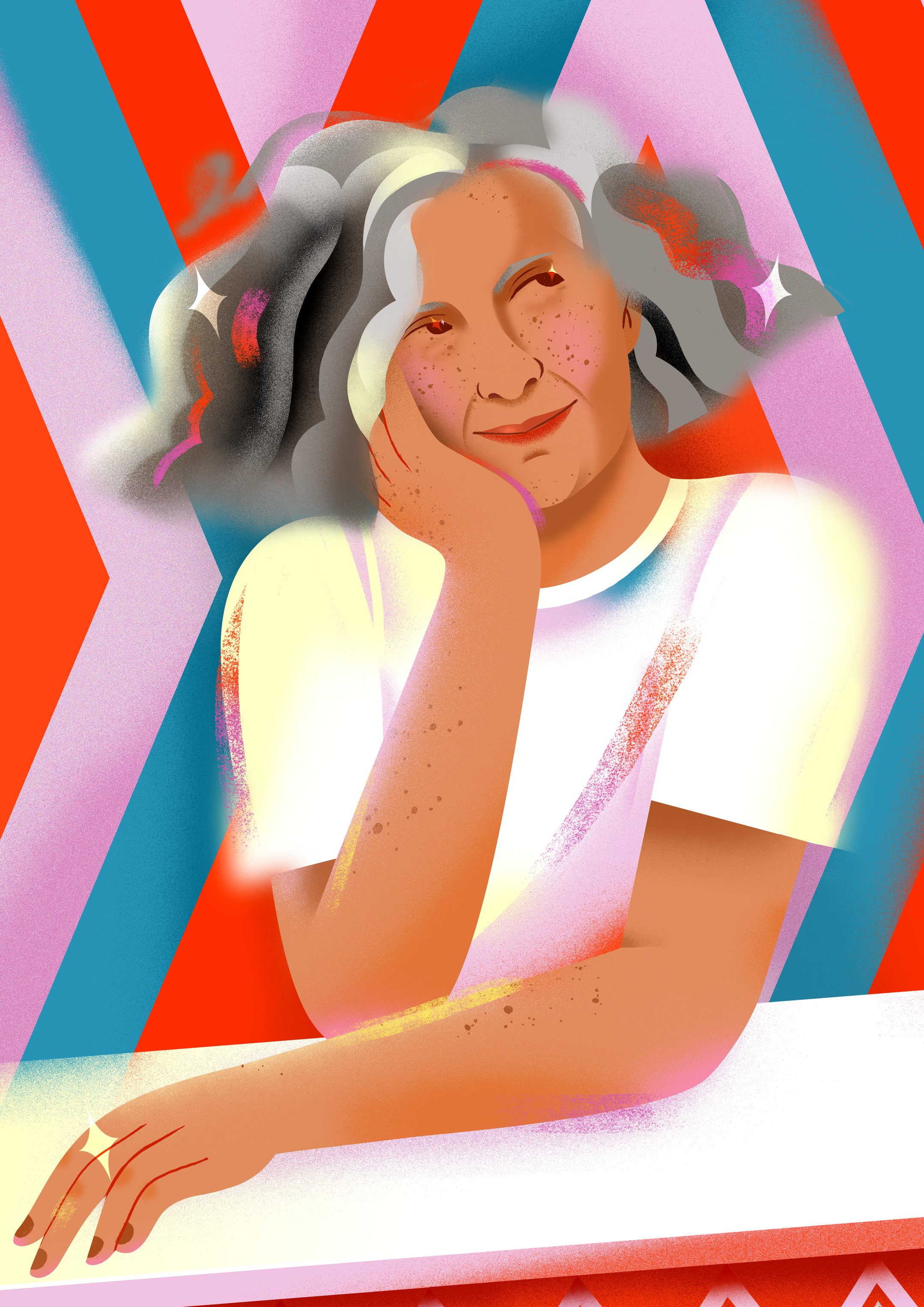
- Illustrated portrait of Margarita Azurdia by Elena Resko
- Born: April 17, 1931; Antigua, Guatemala
- Died: July 1, 1998 (aged 67); Guatemala City, Guatemala
- Other names: Margot Fanjul; Margarita Rita Rica Dinamita; Anastasia Margarita
- Education: Escuela Nacional de Artes Plásticas; McGill University of Liberal Arts-College Margarita Burgeois (San Francisco)
- Movement: New conceptual abstraction

Margarita Azurdia (born April 17, 1931, in Antigua, Guatemala, died July 1, 1998, in Guatemala City, Guatemala), who also worked under the pseudonyms Margot Fanjul, Margarita Rita Rica Dinamita, and Anastasia Margarita, was a feminist Guatemalan sculptor, painter, poet, and performance artist.

== Biography ==
Margarita Azurdia studied at the Escuela Nacional de Artes Plásticas, and at McGill University of Liberal Arts-College Margarita Burgeois, of San Francisco, California.

Azurdia's work reflects her feminist and anti-establishment views. In the 1960s, Azurdia publicly opposed neofigurativism (neofigurativismo), an art movement promoted by a group of male artists known as Grupo Vertebra, and was responsible for starting a new art movement known as new conceptual abstraction (nuevo abstraccionismo conceptual)

In 1962 Azurdia exhibited her first painting, a self-portrait. Between 1971 and 1974, Azurdia created a series of fifty wood figurative sculptures, titled "Tribute to Guatemala" (Homenaje a Guatemala), that combine the sacramental with the profane. The sculptures were carved by local artisans to her specifications, and incorporated ornamental figures—plaster skulls, masks, feathers, pedestal tables—that Azurdia collected from local artisans' stalls. The sculptures depict women carrying firearms, babies riding on crocodiles, and tigers transporting bananas, images reminiscent of the magic realism from Latin American literature.

After spending eight years in Paris where she focused on her poetry and painting, Azurdia returned to Guatemala in 1982, where she defended animal rights, gave workshops on the origins of sacred dance, and continued to write poetry. In 1982, she was a founder of the group Laboratory of Creativity (Laboratorio de Creatividad) that experimented with performance art in public spaces, theater cafes, art galleries, and museums. Through this group, Azurdia explored the notions of ritual in everyday life, space, and time through the medium of dance.

She also presented her work in collective and individual shows in Mexico, the United States, France, and Central America. Some of her work is included in the permanent collection of the National Museum of Modern Art, Guatemala. Azurdia also participated in the biennials of São Paulo and Medellin.

After her death in 1998, her home in Guatemala City (located at 16-39 5th Avenue, zone 10) became a museum, the Museo Margarita Azurdia, where many of her paintings, sculptures, and photographs are displayed.

In 2016, the Nuevo Museo de Arte Contemporáneo (NuMu), the only contemporary art museum in Guatemala, created an exhibit of scaled-down reproductions of two of Azurdia's "Geometric Abstractions" paintings.
