= Casa Alianza =

International non-profit organization

Casa Alianza is an international non-profit organization and the Latin American branch of Covenant House. It is a non-governmental organization (NGO) providing shelter, food, immediate crisis care, and an array of other services to homeless and runaway youth.

== History ==
Casa Alianza was founded in Latin America in 1981 in response to the rampant human rights abuses taking place throughout the region. Casa Alianza was founded by the U.S.-based organization Covenant House, with the first site being founded in Guatemala. Covenant House proceeded to found Casa Alianza Honduras in 1987, Casa Alianza Mexico in 1988, and Casa Alianza Nicaragua in 1998 In addition to Casa Alianza's operations in direct support of children, the organization also has founded three separate fundraising and advocacy branches in Germany and the U.K. In Switzerland, Casa Alianza Switzerland, an independent association under Swiss law, was founded in 1997 to support Casa Alianza programs in Latin America. The organization's international headquarters remains in New York City and is led by Kevin M. Ryan, the former commissioner of New Jersey's Department of Children and Families (see Kevin Ryan (charity executive)). Including the work of Casa Alianza, Covenant House now serves 71,000 children throughout the Americas each year. "Casa Alianza" is the Spanish translation of "Covenant House".

== Awards ==
In 1996, Casa Alianza in Latin America received the Swedish Olof Palme Prize for an "outstanding achievement in the spirit of Olof Palme". The prize was conferred for the organization's "dedicated work to help street children in Guatemala, Honduras and Mexico" and "for the courageous defence of the rights of these children" and was awarded by "Andrée Ruffo and Pierre Dionne, the President and Director General respectively".

In 1999, Casa Alianza in Latin America received the International Award for Children's Rights from the International Bureau for Children's Rights in Montreal, Canada.

In 2000, Casa Alianza received the Conrad N. Hilton Humanitarian Prize, which is claimed to be the "largest humanitarian award in the world". Though the award now comes with a US$1.5 million prize, Casa Alianza received $US 1.0 million in 2000, which apparently was designated for the building of the Hilton Home ("Hogar Conrad N. Hilton") with a capacity of 94 beds. The award was presented by Queen Noor of Jordan.

In 2006, Casa Alianza in Guatemala received the Order of the Quetzal award, which is the highest award that the Guatemalan government bestows upon those doing humanitarian work in Guatemala.

In 2007, on 19 September, Casa Alianza in Guatemala received the Reina Sofia Award for its drug addiction program serving street children.

== Honduras ==
Casa Alianza Honduras was co-founded by Jose Manuel Capellin, and works with children from 12–18 years old. The Honduras branch of Casa Alianza, much like the others through Latin America, focuses on services ranging from street outreach to residential care to family reintegration and preparation for independent life. Casa Alianza Honduras is perhaps best known for its continual push to bring to light the extrajudicial killings of children and young people. In addition, the 2008 Human Rights Report published by the U.S. Department of State cites Casa Alianza as providing nearly half of all beds available for displaced and homeless youth in the country.

== Guatemala ==
On 16 January 2009, Casa Alianza Guatemala declared a financial crisis, ceased operations, and shut down. Prior to closing, Casa Alianza Guatemala was the largest service provider to homeless youth in Guatemala, serving nearly 150 children each night in its residential program and having one of the region's strongest legal support programs for disenfranchised youth. It appears, however, that Covenant House has sponsored a new organization in Guatemala, Asociacion La Alianza, which is in the process of relaunching activities based out of Casa Alianza Guatemala's former facilities. The primary activities of the new organization seem to be focused on fighting the crime of human trafficking via victim protection (residential program).

== Mexico ==
Casa Alianza Mexico was founded in 1988 by Covenant House. The organization serves children from 12 to 18 years of age and comprises six separate homes. The Cenzontle Home phase 1 and 2 home is for newly arrived boys, while the Cenzontle Home phase 3 home is for young men with a longer time in the program. The Quetzal Homes follow a similar structure, with 3 separate homes (phases 1, 2 and 3) that serve a range from newly arrived to long-term stay girls and young women. The SEDAC/Hogar Palomas serves young mothers with their babies up to the age of 24.

== Nicaragua ==
Founded in January 1998, Casa Alianza Nicaragua proceeded from a long history of support from Nicaragua's first two freely elected presidents. Both Violeta Chamorro and Arnoldo Aleman publicly expressed support for bringing Casa Alianza to Nicaragua, and ultimately Covenant House moved for its foundation. Following its foundation in January 1998, August of the same year saw the opening of a residential program for 26 boys and 8 girls coming off the streets. Although Casa Alianza Nicaragua's age range was 14–18 in its early existence, it quickly moved to a range of approximately 10–20 in response to the nation's need. In 2001, Casa Alianza Nicaragua opened a young mothers program for 15 mothers and their babies as well as a separate residence for 25 formerly homeless young girls. In 2003, the Conrad N. Hilton Home in Managua was completed and formally dedicated with the help of a US$1.0 million prize stemming from the Conrad N. Hilton Humanitarian Award. The home would house 94 beds for formerly homeless young boys and girls.

Casa Alianza Nicaragua participated in the 2010 Street Child World Cup in Durban, South Africa, placing in a tie for 3rd with the United Kingdom.

== José Manuel Capellín ==
Having served at one time or another as National Director of Casa Alianza in each of its four countries, as well as 20 years as the National Director of Casa Alianza Honduras, José Manuel ("Menin") Capellín is perhaps the most prominent figure in Casa Alianza's 29-year history in Latin America. The Spaniard was recognized in 2008 as one of 13 Modern Heroes in the Fight Against Human Trafficking, an honor bestowed by the U.S. Department of State in its annual Trafficking in Persons Report. Menin retired from the post as National Director of Casa Alianza Honduras in 2012.
