= Carmen Lind Pettersen =

Guatemalan painter

- circa 1930
- Born: Carmen Dorotea Gehrke de María y Campos; 6 March 1900; Guatemala City, Guatemala
- Died: 1991 (aged 90–91) "El Zapote", Escuintla Department, Guatemala
- Other name: Carmen Dorothy Lind-Pettersen
- Occupations: farmer, painter, gardener
- Years active: 1925–1984
- Known for: watercolors of the landscape and costumes of the high plateau

Carmen Lind Pettersen (6 March 1900–1991) was a Guatemalan painter known for her watercolors of the landscape and traditional costumes of Guatemala, as well as her book, the most complete reference work on the textiles of the Guatemalan high plateau. Her works were often listed in guidebooks for the country and in 1976, she was awarded the Order of the Quetzal for her artistic merit. Some of her paintings are in the permanent collection of the Ixchel Museum of Indigenous Textiles and Clothing.

== Early life ==
Carmen Dorotea Gehrke de María y Campos was born and baptized 6 March 1900, in Sagrario Parish, of Guatemala City, Guatemala to María Magdalena Soledad Isabel de María y Campos Hoffmann and Arthur Henry Theodore Gehrke (aka Arturo Enrique Teodoro Gehrke). Her father was a British agent for the import-export company Rosing Brothers and Company, while her mother was from Veracruz, Mexico. When the couple immigrated to Guatemala, they settled with two children, Enelda Francisca and Arthur Richard in the Jocotenango neighborhood of Guatemala City. While in Guatemala, the family grew, adding Carmen and another son, Conrad in 1903. In 1904, Arthur was transferred with Rosing Brothers to London.

In 1909, Gehrke entered the Tunbridge Wells Girls' Grammar School, a boarding school, in Royal Tunbridge Wells, where she began studying painting and developed an interest in nature, spending hours in Kew Gardens. In 1917, she began studying at the Royal Polytechnic Institution on Regent Street in London. Near the end of the war, she met Leif Lind Pettersen, who was visiting from Guatemala with his uncle Walter Lind. Walter Lind (born Lind Pettersen) was an Englishman, born to Norwegian parents, who also worked in Guatemala for Rosing Brothers and owned a coffee plantation. Earthquakes in Guatemala between 1917 and 1918 had devastated the country and in 1923, Arthur was asked to return to the country. He traveled with María and his two daughters, and the family took up residence on one of Walter Lind's farms, known as Helvetia, as Guatemala City was uninhabitable. Gehrke and Leif Lind Pettersen renewed their friendship, which quickly turned into a romance and the couple were married in 1925 in Retalhuleu. At the time of their marriage, Leif was suffering from malaria and immediately after the ceremony, Carmen took him to Guatemala City to recover.

== Career ==
After Leif’s recovery, the couple bought a coffee farm known as "La Colonia" near El Tumbador. They managed it for several years, until 1929 when the plummet in coffee prices due to the Great Depression forced them to sell and buy a cinchona farm known as El Zapote, in the Escuintla Department on the slopes of the Volcán de Fuego. This turned out to be a precipitous purchase, as during World War II, the Japanese captured Indonesia, cutting off the supply to the seeds of the cinchona, which were needed to make quinine. The demand and Leif's agreement with the United States government and Merck and Company, soon made their farm one of the largest in the area producing chinchona.

In the 1930s, Lind Pettersen began gardening on the farm and painting the landscapes she saw, focusing on the diversity of the trees and flora of the Guatemalan coastal piedmont, which few had painted or studied. Her works documented the era of transformation of jungles to rural coffee plantations, showing agricultural migration as well as environmental change. Studying design at Kew Gardens, in 1958 with the help of Venancio Tubac Salazar, she created a botanical garden which became the largest in the region. It featured three lagoons, which became a haven for migrating coastal herons, as well as large trees which were filled with parrots and other tropical birds. As an observer of her world, she began to study the costumes of the farm workers and domestics that helped on the farm. Noticing that over time the dress styles were changing, Pettersen began to draw and catalogue them. A friend sent her a collection of Mayan costumes, which Pettersen duplicated in watercolor, having her employees and friends pose as models. The work took six years to complete, and she is now known mostly for these watercolors of the traditional costumes of Guatemala. In 1976, Lind Pettersen published Maya of Guatemala: Vida y Traje/Life and Dress, a bilingual book, which is the most complete reference work on the textiles of the Guatemalan high plateau. That same year, she received the Order of the Quetzal for her artistic merit of preserving the cultural heritage.

In 1984, Pettersen began losing her sight and rather than give up art, began teaching. She held an exhibit of her works in 1986 at the National School of Visual Arts and was listed in guidebooks for Guatemala as a reference for the study of textiles and for her watercolors with works on display in the 1990s at the Ixchel Museum and the Museo Nacional de Arte Moderno "Carlos Mérida".

== Death and legacy ==
Lind Pettersen died in 1991. She has over sixty paintings in the permanent collections of the Ixchel Museum of Indigenous Textiles and Clothing in Guatemala City. After her death, the garden she developed on their farm became a nature reserve and is opened once a month to the public. In 2017, the Ixchel Museum hosted an exhibit of around thirty of her works throughout the month of February.
