= José Luis Álvarez (artist) =

Guatemalan artist (1917–2012)

- Born: 3 June 1917; Guatemala City, Guatemala
- Died: 5 February 2012 (aged 94); Antigua Guatemala
- Known for: Landscape painting; impasto technique; art restoration
- Movement: Guatemalan School

José Luis Álvarez (3 June 1917 in Guatemala City – 5 February 2012 in Antigua Guatemala) was a Guatemalan artist who, from 1976 until his death, lived and painted in Antigua. He became known as one of the best landscape artists from Guatemala and was part of a generation of prolific artists who, as exponents of national art, defined the Guatemalan School. Álvarez developed a distinguished wide impasto technique, using the spatula, and a great delicacy in the use of color.

== Early career ==
Álvarez had exhibited his works in domestic and international solo and group exhibitions, but notably in Guatemala at the Instituto Guatemalteco Americano (IGA), the National School of Fine Arts, la Fundación Arte Paiz, Juannio National Art Exhibition, Rotary Auction, and the National Art Gallery.

=== Awards ===
In 1938 he won second prize in the National Competition Fair November. He also won first, second and third prizes at the Fiesta de los Morenos in Mixco, and won multiple prizes in Quetzaltenango. In the Arturo Martínez competition, won the first prize three consecutive times.

=== National commissions ===
In 1948, he was commissioned to help restore the National Palace of Guatemala and the Church of San Juan del Obispo. He restored altar pieces and colonial paintings. He also remade missing gilded gold leaf pieces for the colonial assemblies.

=== National restoration project sponsored by UNESCO ===
In 1956, the Guatemalan Commission for UNESCO organized and underwrote the restoration of several paintings from the Guatemalan colonial era. Projects were carried out in specialized workshops in the Capuchin Convent in Antigua. The restorations were led by a mission headed by a British expert sent by UNESCO, Helmut Ruhemann (1891–1973), and had as national partners to Carlos Morales, Luis Álvarez, and his son, Luis Alberto Álvarez. (Note: Luis Alberto had been an art student of his father, José Luis Álvarez, and learned restoration techniques from him. Like his father, Luis Alberto studied at the National School of Fine Arts. Luis Alberto worked with his father in Antigua and Guatemala City. He is a painter. (unidentified paper)) The Ministry of Education, directors of national museums and the directors of the Department of Fine Arts facilitated its development. The restored works were exhibited at the National School of Fine Arts. UNESCO bestowed Álvarez with a restorer diploma in 1956.

=== Restoration in Guatemala City ===
In 1958, he returned to Guatemala City to resume restoring works that had been delayed for over half a century, carving, gilding and parts embodied colonial style. He also devoted himself to the restoration of paintings and antique images. He taught privately at the Galería Ríos, a gallery founded by Miguel Ángel Ríos (1914–1991) in the early 1950s.

=== Educator ===
In 1959, Álvarez joined the faculty of the National School of Fine Arts where he flourished for 27 years until he retired to continue working in his workshop in Antigua, Guatemala.

== Selected works ==
Álvarez is known as a master of light who painted Guatemalan landscapes from unique perspectives. Often, Álvarez highlighted the contrast between light and shadows, creating optical illusions.

- The "Corte de Cafe" ("Court of Coffee") is one if his well-known works, which, as of 1992, has been depicted on the back of a 50 quetzal Guatemalan currency. The original is held by the Bank of Guatemala.

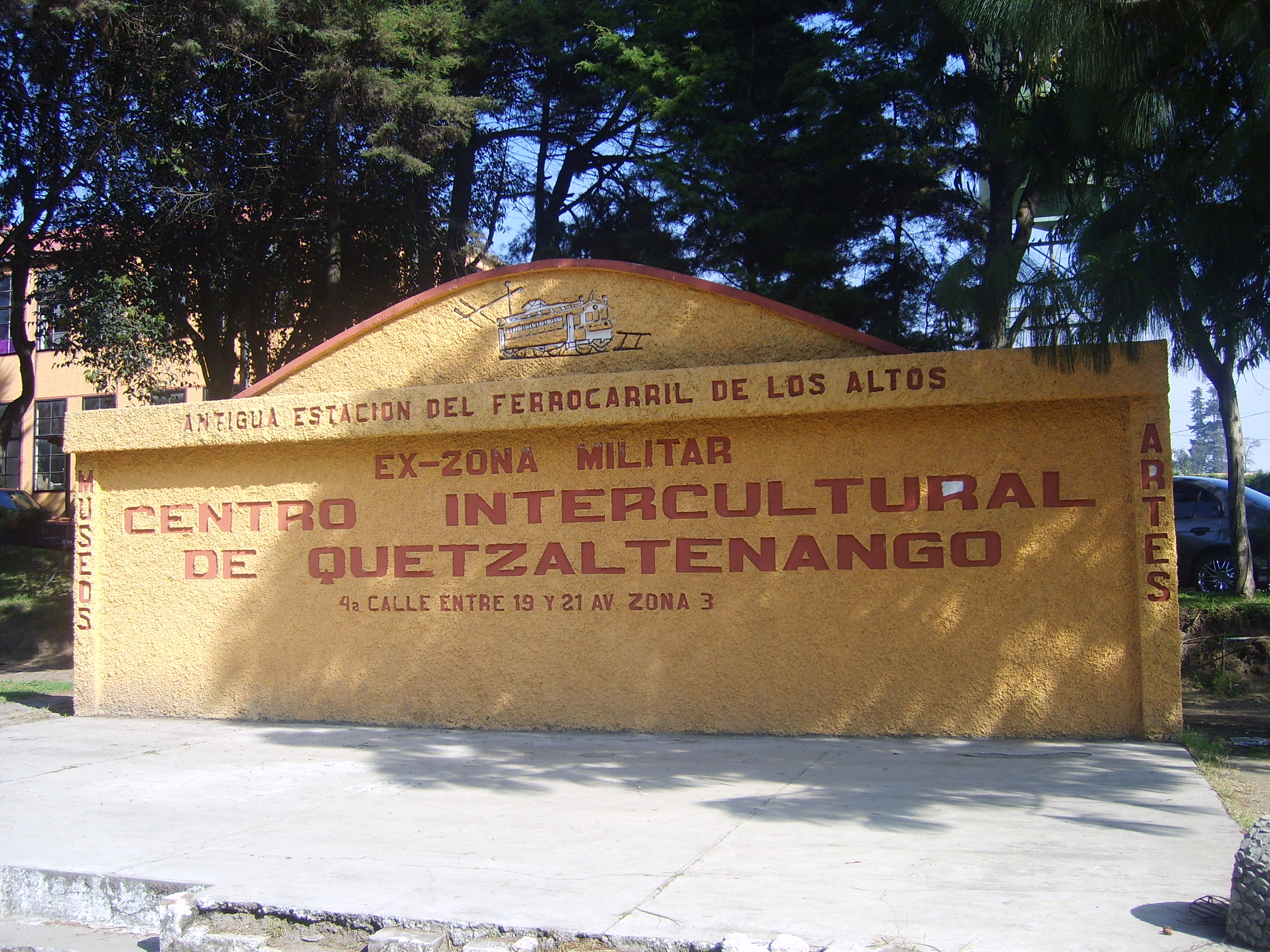
Wind Turbines at Apogee Stadium

Many of Álvarez's works are on permanent exhibition at Museo de Arte. (Note: The Museo de Arte, located in the Cultural Center at Calle 4a and Avenue 19, is next to the Museo del Ferrocarril FEGUA, an abandoned railway station that was converted to a railway museum, and Ixchel Museum of Indigenous Textiles and Clothing, a weaving and textiles museum.)

- Alvarez painted a scene of people fleeing from volcanic lava flow, depicting people expressing distress. A road is illuminated by the light of lanterns and the bright glare of lava. The work, painted at night, is currently in a private collection in New York.
- Another work showing an erupting Volcano sold in 1961 to the Bank of Guatemala. Tabacalera Nacional then reproduced it on an Almanac.

== Formal education ==
At 14, Álvarez was in a workshop of commercial painting. At 15, he began studying at the National School of Fine Arts in Guatemala City. His teachers included Humberto Garavito (1897–1970), Enrique Acuña Orantes (1876–1946), and Antonio Tejeda Fonseca (1908–1966). Federico Wilhelm Schaeffer (1887–1957), Óscar González Goyrí (1887–1974), and Rafael Yela Günther (1888–1942). At 16, he moved to the workshop called "El Tigre." There, he designed labels and tags with drawings to the decanter and Tabacalera Nacional. He rapidly adapted to his new job and was mentored by the shop teacher Flavio Salazar.
