= Division of Child Protection and Permanency =

New Jersey child protection agency

The Division of Child Protection and Permanency is New Jersey's child protection agency. It is part of the Department of Children and Families. From 1996 through 2012, it was called Division of Youth and Family Services (DYFS)[DYE-fuss]. Before 1996 It was called Child Protection Services.

== History ==
Its stated mission is to "ensure the safety, permanency and well-being of children and to support families." The division is responsible for investigating allegations of child abuse and neglect and, when needed, arranging for the child's protection... In 2004 New Jersey's Child Advocate, Kevin Ryan called DYFS a "systematic failure" and "a debilitated agency that was in need of a complete overhaul."

== Cases ==
- In 2003 Bruce Jackson, a 19-year-old boy who weighed only 45 pounds was found eating food out of a garbage can in Collingswood, New Jersey. The parents, authorities allege, were starving him and under feeding the other children. In October 2005, lawyers for the four boys settled their lawsuit against New Jersey for $12.5 million. It was one of the largest settlements in the United States for a child welfare case.
- In 2013, a $166 million verdict was handed down against the New Jersey Department of Youth and Family Services (now known as the Division of Child Protection and Permanency) in a case concerning a 4-year-old boy beaten by his father. The award was given to Jadiel Velesquez, who lawyers said suffered severe brain damage in the alleged beating. Jadiel Velesquez's grandparents sued, accusing the agency of failing to remove the boy from his home after he was brought to the hospital with unexplained bruises. The grandparents claimed they were inflicted by the boy's father. Lawyers said the boy was returned to his mother's home despite a doctor's finding of abuse. The beating that left him dependent on 24-hour-care happened weeks later. Jadiel's father pleaded guilty to beating his son and is serving a six-year prison term for aggravated assault, lawyers said. The state of NJ plans to appeal the record-setting verdict.
