= Rodolfo Abularach =

Guatemalan painter and printmaker (1933–2020)

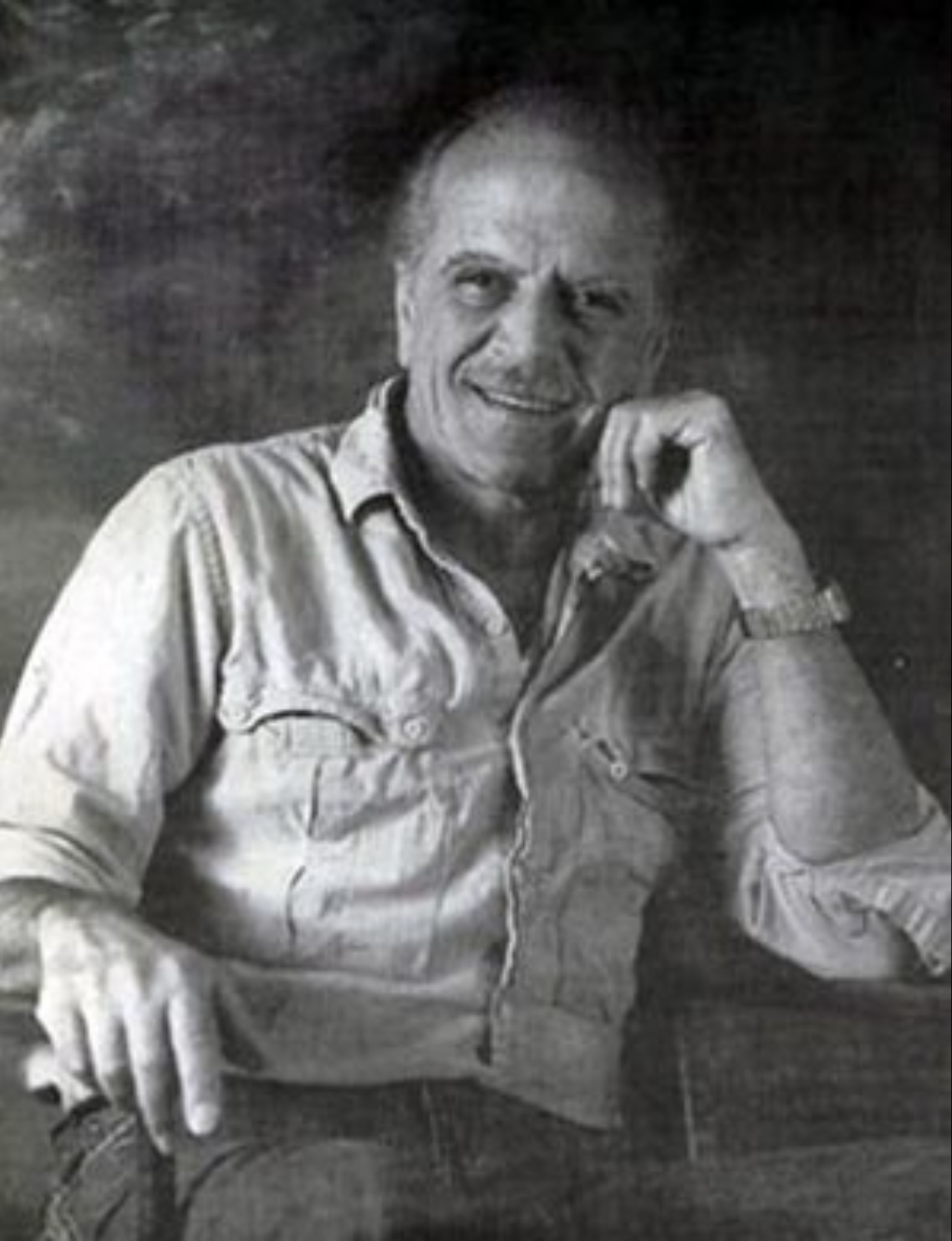
- Photo of Rodolfo Abularach
- Born: January 7, 1933; Guatemala City, Guatemala
- Died: August 30, 2020 (aged 87)
- Education: Escuela Nacional de Artes Plásticas; Art Students League of New York; Graphic Arts Center, New York
- Known for: Painting; printmaking

Rodolfo Abularach (January 7, 1933 – August 30, 2020) was a Guatemalan painter and printmaker of Palestinian descent.

== Biography ==
He was born in Guatemala City. His work focuses mainly on the human eye. He attended the Escuela Nacional de las Artes Plásticas in Guatemala City, starting in 1947 and graduating in 1954. Later on, he studied in New York City on a Guatemalan government grant, studying at the Arts Student League and Graphic Arts center.

His works were featured in a 2019 exhibition at the Art Museum of the Americas in Washington, D.C.

== Permanent collections ==
Permanent Collections (selection)

Metropolitan Museum, New York

MOMA - Museum of Modern Art, New York

AMA - Art Museum of the Americas (OEA), Washington, D.C.

Collection of Chase Manhattan Bank, New York

New York Public Library, New York

New York Interchem, New York

Hammer Museum of Los Angeles, CA

Norton Simon Museum, Pasadena, California

Collection Grundwald

Sala Luis Angel Arango, Bogotá, Colombia

Instituto de Cultura Hispánica, Madrid, Spain

University of Massachusetts, Massachusetts

High Museum of Art, Atlanta, Georgia

Museo de Arte Moderno, Bogotá, Colombia

Museo de la Universidad de Puerto Rico, Puerto Rico

Museo de Arte, Caracas, Venezuela

Sala Mendoza, Fundación Mendoza, Caracas, Venezuela

Cartón y Papel de México, México, D.F.

Museo Cuevas, México DF

IDB - Inter-American Development Bank, Washington, D.C.

SFMOMA - San Francisco Museum of Modern Art, San Francisco, California

Colección Leticia Guerrero, Banco de Quito, Quito, Ecuador

MUNAM - Museo de Arte Moderno, Ciudad de Guatemala

Dirección de Artes, El Salvador

Museo de la “Pinacoteca Nacional”, La Paz, Bolivia

Museo de Arte Contemporáneo, São Paulo, Brasil

Museo de Arte “La Tertulia”, Cali, Colombia

Fleming Museum of Art, Vermont

Milwaukee Art Museum (MAM), Milwaukee, Wisconsin

Musée d’Art et d’Histoire, Geneva, Switzerland

Universidad Central de Venezuela, Venezuela

Lowe Art Museum, Miami

Alternative Center for International Arts, New York

LACMA - Los Angeles County Museum of Art, Los Angeles, California

National Museum of Warsaw, Warsaw, Poland

Consejo Mundial de Grabado, San Francisco, California

Museum of Art, Bagdad, Iraq

Museum of Art, Cairo, Egypt

The University of Texas at Austin, Austin, Texas

Amon Carter Museum of American Art, Fort Worth, Texas

Museo Panarte, Panamá

Royal Museum of Art, Copenhagen, Denmark

Museo Del Barrio, New York

Banco de Guatemala, Guatemala

Museum of International and Contemporary Graphic Arts, Fredrikstad, Norway

== Awards ==
1957. First Prize in Painting: "Central American Contest" Guatemala City

1959. Prize in Drawing, V Biennial, São Paulo, Brazil

1961. Prize in Drawing, New York University, NY

1963. First Prize in Drawing, "Current Art of America and Spain", Madrid, Spain

1965 First Prize in Painting, "Salon Esso de Jóvenes Artistas", El Salvador, C.A.

1967 First Prize in Drawing, Universidad Central, Caracas, Venezuela

1969 First Prize in Drawing, IX Festival of Art, Cali, Colombia

1970 Prize in Graphic Arts, Silvermine Guild of Artists, Connecticut

Foreign Relations Award, Biennial of American Graphic Arts, Santiago, Chile

First Prize in Drawing, National Drawing Exhibition, San Francisco Museum of Art, San Francisco, California

First Prize in Drawing, Pan American Exhibition of Graphic Arts, Cali, Colombia

1971 Prize in Graphic Arts, IV International Miniature Graphics Exhibition, New York, NY

1972 Prize in Graphic Arts, II Latin American Biennial of Graphic Arts, San Juan, Puerto Rico

1977 Prize in Graphic Arts, I Biennial of American Art, Venezuela

1980 Special Edition Award and Merit Award, III International Biennial, World Print Council, San Francisco, California

1987 Silver Medal, Latin American Biennial, Buenos Aires, Argentina

2003 Tribute Municipality of Guatemala;

2010 Tribute "Artist of the Year" from the Rozas Botrán Foundation, Guatemala

2017 Medal of the Orden del Arrayán, Guatemala

2019 Carlos Mérida” Award, Guatemala

== Solo shows (more than 100 shows) ==
1947 Galería Nacional de Turismo, Ciudad de Guatemala

1954 Galería Arcadi, Ciudad de Guatemala

1955 Studies in Pen and Ink, Escuela de Artes Plásticas del Museo Arqueológico de Guatemala

1961 David Herbert Gallery, New York, NY

1966 Sala L.A. Arango, Banco de la Republica, Bogotá, Colombia

1967 Galería Schaefer-Diaz, Guatemala City

1969 Bucholz Gallery, Munich, Germany

1970 Galería Colibri, San Juan, Puerto Rico; Galería Vertebra, Ciudad de Guatemala; Graham Gallery, New York, NY; Pyramid Gallery, Washington D.C.

1971 Galería San Diego, Bogotá, Colombia;

1972 Westbeth Gallery, New York, NY

1973 Museo de la Universidad de Puerto Rico, Puerto Rico; “Sala Estudio Actual” Caracas, Venezuela; Galería Fundación, Caracas, Venezuela

1974 Museo de Arte Moderno, Bogotá, Colombia; Escuela Nacional de Artes Plásticas, Ciudad de Guatemala; Galería Pacanis, México D.F.; Galería Forma, San Salvador, El Salvador.

1975 Galería Siglo Veintiuno, Quito, Ecuador; Galería Briseno, Lima, Perú

1976 Balería Echandi, Ministerio de Cultura, San José, Costa Rica; Galería Tague, Managua, Nicaragua; Galería Estructura, Panamá City; Alternative Center of the Arts, Nueva York, NY

1977 Arte Actual de Iberoamerica, Madrid, Spain

1978 Galería San Diego, Bogotá, Colombia; Galería El Túnel, Guatemala City; Universidad de Medellín, Medellín, Colombia

1979 La Galería, Quito, Ecuador; Galería Panarte, Panamá City, Panamá

1980 Galería Partes, Medellín, Colombia

1981 Museo Rayo, Roldanillo, Colombia; Moss Gallery, San Francisco, California; Miami Dade Public Library System, Miami, Florida; Galería Arte 80, Panamá City, Panamá

1982 Centro de Arte Actual, Pereira, Colombia; Borjeson Gallery, Malmo, Sweden; Galería Atenea, Barranquilla, Colombia; Galería Siete, Caracas, Venezuela

1983 Galería Diners, Bogotá, Colombia; Galería Etc.étera, Ciudad de Panamá

1985 Museo Ixchel Guatemala City

1986 Galería Casa de la Cultura, Santa Cruz, Bolivia; Museo Nacional de Arte, La Paz, Bolivia; Centro Cultural Portales, Cochabamba, Bolivia;Galería Época, Santiago de Chile

1988 Galería del Patronato de Bellas Artes, Ciudad de Guatemala

1989 Galería del Patronato de Bellas Artes, Ciudad de Guatemala; Galería El Túnel, Guatemala City

1991 Galería Plástica Contemporánea, Ciudad de Guatemala; Art Miami 91, Miami, Florida

1992 Museo Rayo, Roldanillo, Colombia; Museo Brattlebord, Art Center, Vermont

1994 Museo de Arte Contemporáneo de Panamá

1996 Esculturas de Rodolfo Abularach, Galería “El Ático”, Ciudad de Guatemala

1997 Galería “Valanti”, San José, Costa Rica; Retrospectiva Museo de Arte Contemporáneo Paiz, Ciudad de Guatemala; Anita Shapolsky Gallery, New York, NY

1998 Aldo Castillo Gallery, Chicago, Illinois

1999 “Volcanos and other Fires” CDS Gallery, New York, NY

2000 Museo Ixchel (Arte Religioso), Ciudad de Guatemala

2005 Centro Cultural de España y Centros de Formación de la Cooperación Española, Ciudad de Guatemala

2006 Proyecto Cultural El Sitio, Antigua Guatemala, Guatemala

2007 Centro Cultural de España, Ciudad de Guatemala

2008 Retrospectiva, Museo Santo Domingo, Antigua Guatemala

2010 Galería El Túnel, Ciudad de Guatemala

2011 Museo Rayo, Colombia

2013 Museo Rayo, Colombia

2016 Galería Sol Del Río, Ciudad de Guatemala

2017 Centro Municipal de Arte - Correos, Guatemala

2019 Municipalidad de Guatemala

2020 AMA - Art Museum of the Americas (OEA), Washington DC

2021 Museo nacional Carlos Mérida - MUNAM, Ciudad de Guatemala
