= Escuela Nacional de Artes Plásticas =

Escuela Nacional de Artes Plásticas (Spanish for 'National School of Plastic Arts') may refer to:

- National School of Arts (UNAM), of the Universidad Nacional Autónoma de México (UNAM), Mexico City
- Escuela Nacional de Artes Plásticas "Rafael Rodríguez Padilla", art school in Guatemala City, Guatemala
