= Luis Rolando Ixquiac Xicara =

No Es Fácil, oil on board, 1977, by Luis Rolando Ixquiac Xicara

Luis Rolando Ixquiac Xicará (born 1947) is an Indigenous artist born in Quetzaltenango, Guatemala. He studied at the Escuela Nacional de Artes Plásticas "Rafael Rodríguez Padilla" in Guatemala, and continued his studies in Paris, France.

He is known, principally in Latin America, for his ability to combine abstract art with vernacular art forms (sometimes referred to as primitivism or Naïve art) to represent elements of the natural Guatemalan landscape, including animals. While Ixquiac Xicara shares the tradition of neo-naïf, or folk imagery, art, he creates images through a modernist abstract lens. He works in oil on board and canvas, and also produces drawings and watercolors on paper.

Ixquiac Xicará's art is held in the collection of the Museo Nacional de Arte Moderno "Carlos Mérida" in Guatemala City, and in the collection of the Museo de Arte Contemporaneo in Panama City. His paintings have been sold at auction by Bonhams in Los Angeles and Clars Auction Gallery in Oakland, California. He has been represented by Artique and the Galeria El Tunel, both in Guatemala City. He has had solo exhibitions in diverse venues, including Casa de America Latina, Paris, France; Moscicki Center in Brussels, Belgium; and the French Cultural Center in Abidjan, Ivory Coast. Museum and gallery curators have also included his art in group exhibits, among them the IV Biennial Americana de Grabado in Santiago, Chile; the Museum of Contemporary Art in Panama City, Panama; and a Contemporary Mayan Art exhibit in Norway.

== Selected works ==
- Fiesta. Acrylic on canvas. Height 92 cm x width 118 cm. Collection of the Banco de Guatemala
- Sin Título. Acrylic on canvas. Height 49 cm x width 49 cm. 1977. Collection of the Museo de Arte Contemporaneo, Panama City, Panama.

== See also ==
- Abstract Art
- Escuela Nacional de Artes Plásticas "Rafael Rodríguez Padilla"
