= DCPP (disambiguation) =

2,3-Dichlorophenylpiperazine is a chemical compound.

DCPP may also refer to:

- Disease Control Priorities Project, a joint enterprise
- Diablo Canyon Power Plant, a nuclear power plant in California
- Division of Child Protection and Permanency, the New Jersey child protection agency
- Direzione Centrale della Polizia di Prevenzione, the Italian national Central Police Directorate for Crime Prevention; see Divisione Investigazioni Generali e Operazioni Speciali
