= Bispo =

Bispo may refer to:

People:

- Daniel Bispo (born 1974), boxer from Brazil
- Diego Andrade Silva Bispo (born 1989), Brazilian defender
- Rodolfo Dantas Bispo (born 1982), versatile Brazilian footballer who played defender
- Rogério Bispo (born 1985), Brazilian long jumper
- Pedro Bispo Moreira Junior (born 1987), Brazilian striker
- Adriano Bispo dos Santos (born 1987), defensive midfielder
- Jose Bispo Clementino dos Santos (1913–2008), Brazilian samba singer known as Jamelão
- Bispo (rapper) (born 1992), Portuguese rapper

Places:

- Nossa Senhora do Bispo (Montemor-o-Novo), Portuguese civil parish in the municipality of Montemor-o-Novo
- Sagres (Vila do Bispo), town located in the municipality of Vila do Bispo, Algarve, Portugal
- Santa Catarina da Fonte do Bispo, freguesia (parish) in the municipality of Tavira (Algarve, Portugal)
- Vila do Bispo Municipality, municipality in Portugal

== See also ==
- Bespoke
- Bishpool
- Bispøyan
- Obispo (disambiguation)
- Vispop
