= Martha Bolaños de Prado =

Guatemalan actor and educator (1897–1963)

Marta Bolaños de Prado
- Born: María Marta Bolaños Schaeffer; 15 January 1897; Guatemala City, Guatemala
- Died: 4 June 1963 (aged 66); Guatemala City, Guatemala
- Occupations: actor, musician, composer, educator
- Years active: 1918-1963
- Known for: founding the National Children's Theater Company and Children's Radio Theater

Marta Bolaños de Prado (15 January 1897 – 4 June 1963) was a Guatemalan actress, musician, composer and educator. Initially appearing in musical comedies and as an accompanist to the Arruyo Chorus, she began teaching singing and founded the National Children's Theater Company in 1931. In 1946, she inaugurated her group of youth actors' appearance on radio and in 1958 took them to television. She received Guatemala's highest honor, the Order of the Quetzal in 1962 and in 1992 a presidential honor was named in her memory to recognize exceptional contributions to the arts.

== Early life ==
María Marta Bolaños Schaeffer was born on 15 January 1897 in Guatemala City, Guatemala to Josefina Schaeffer and Salvador Bolaños. (Note: Sources for Bolaños' birth typically cite her as being born in 1900.) She studied acting with Adriana Saravia de Palarea and performed in Guatemala's vaudeville and zarzuela theaters. Her debut was in the theater operated by Jesús de Quiñónez and later, she performed at the Teatro Renacimiento. Her greatest success was during 1918 and 1919, when she performed in pieces like The Count of Luxembourg, The Duchess of Bal Tabarin and The Merry Widow, under the direction of Alberto de la Riva. She also studied piano under Felipe Tronchi and Enrique Tuit and served as the accompanist of the Arruyo Chorus for a decade.

== Career ==
Bolaños began giving singing and theatrical classes, working with several different public schools. She also composed music, with lyrics written by Gustavo Schwartz. Some of her most noted pieces are Alma mixqueña, Chancaca, El zopilote, Negros frijolitos and Pepita. In 1931, she founded the National Children's Theater Company. The young actors performed morning shows for children in the Teatro Capital and Teatro Palace.

In 1946, José Castañeda Medinilla, who was the director of the National Radio TGW (es), proposed to Bolaños that her Children's Theater begin performing on the radio. Adapting their material of children's stories dramatized by students, the program, which featured a cast of youth between five and seventeen years old, first went on air 15 August 1946. In 1958, Radioteatro Infantil (Children's Radio Theater) was inaugurated on television, appearing on the country's first television station, Televisión Nacional Channel 8. In 1962, she received the Order of the Quetzal, Guatemala's highest honor.

== Death and legacy ==
Bolaños died on 4 June 1963 and in 1992 was posthumously recognized for her contributions to the arts when a presidential honor, the Order of Martha Bolaños de Prado, was created to be conferred on exceptional artists in the fields of dance, singing and theater. The first recipient of new order was her daughter, Marina Prado Bolaños, who had taken over the direction of the Radioteatro Infantil after her mother's death. The radio show she founded is still being produced and is now directed by her granddaughter, Anabella Palma Andrade. In 2016, the new director of Radio TGW decided that for the first time, Radioteatro Infantil would no longer be a live broadcast, but would become pre-recorded.
