= Bruce Ritter =

American Roman Catholic priest

Father Bruce Ritter (February 25, 1927 – October 7, 1999) was a Catholic priest and one-time Franciscan friar who founded the charity Covenant House in 1972 for homeless teenagers. By the 1980s, it had grown to an $87 million agency, operating numerous large centers in New York and six other major United States cities, as well as locations in Toronto, Canada, and Latin America.

In 1990, Ritter was forced to resign from Covenant House after allegations of sexual and financial misconduct. It was one of the most widely publicized cases of sexual abuse within the Catholic Church. However no charges were filed against him. Independent investigation commissioned by the charity found none of the allegations of sexual misconduct can be proved beyond any question, but that cumulative evidence was extensive.

He also left the Franciscans, but retained his priestly faculties. He retired to a small town in upstate New York.

== Early life and education ==
Bruce Ritter was born in Trenton, New Jersey, and grew up in nearby Hamilton Township. His father died in 1931 when he was four, and his mother struggled financially during the Great Depression of the 1930s, raising five children on a widow's pension and a series of odd jobs. Ritter graduated from Hamilton High School West in 1945, worked briefly in a local industry, and joined the United States Navy near the end of World War II.

In 1947 following the war, he took the name Bruce when he entered the Order of Friars Minor Conventual. He transferred for a time to explore monastic life as a Trappist, but returned. Ritter was ordained as a Franciscan in 1956. He completed his doctoral thesis on The Primacy and the Council of Florence at the Conventual seminary in Rome in 1959, but never revised or published it in an academic journal. After a series of short-term teaching assignments at a variety of Franciscan institutions, Ritter arrived at Manhattan College in the Bronx to teach theology in 1963.

== Lower East Side ministry ==
In 1968, Ritter had given a commencement speech at the College attacking American society for becoming grievously disconnected from the teachings of Jesus. Ritter had been praised by the students for his speech, but challenged that he ought to practice his preaching. Ritter resigned from the college, and began a new ministry on the Lower East Side of New York City. He recruited a fellow Franciscan friar, Father James Fitzgibbon, to move to this troubled neighborhood and initiate what he described as a "ministry of availability" to the poor. The Archdiocese of New York assigned Ritter and Fitzgibbon to the local parish, St. Brigid's Church. It had been designated as an experimental parish, in that it was structured around a team ministry. The Franciscans lived in a tenement building on East 7th Street, which Ritter described as a place where he washed his dishes in the bathtub and paid $90 a month in rent. Although poverty was the main focus of Ritter's teaching, he soon found a more pressing issue, as he had moved into a high crime neighborhood plagued by heavy drug use. The friars were not immune to this situation, and their apartment was frequently broken into and robbed. One time, Father Bruce's religious habit was taken by the thieves. Gradually they accumulated a following of young volunteers who moved to the East Village, Manhattan, and surrounding apartments in an effort to live in community, and to effect social and political change. Although Fitzgibbon eventually left the ministry, several other individuals, including Adrian Gately, Patricia Kennedy, and Paul Frazier proved instrumental in defining the early years.

== Covenant House ==
By the early 1970s, Ritter decided to concentrate on sheltering homeless youths. The issue of "runaways" was receiving considerable national media attention; Greenwich Village appeared to be a magnet that attracted many homeless youths. He formally incorporated his ministry as Covenant House in 1972 and received his first grant from the New York City Addiction Services Agency to support his work. Ritter soon began acquiring other properties and opened a series of boys' and girls' group homes, primarily in the Greenwich Village and East Village neighborhoods. In 1976, he announced plans to open a multi-service center for youths near the Port Authority Bus Terminal in Times Square. He began to gain considerable publicity by claiming that he was rescuing youths who had arrived in New York City and had been lured into the child pornography and prostitution trades.

By the late 1980s, Covenant House had moved away from the small group home approach and opened large shelters with training programs in seven United States cities, as well as in Canada (e.g. Toronto) and Latin America. Its budget approached US$90,000,000, and it spent three times what the federal government did on runaways. He called the teenagers in the Covenant House "my kids", "nice kids", and "gorgeous kids". Ritter wrote two books, Covenant House: Lifeline to the Street (New York: Doubleday, 1987) and Sometimes God Has a Kid's Face, which detailed his experience in starting up Covenant House and provided his perspective on homeless teenagers.

In 1984, President Ronald Reagan praised Covenant House in his State of the Union address for their efforts in aiding homeless and runaway youth. In 1985, Ritter served on US Attorney General Edwin Meese's Commission on Pornography.

In 1988, Ritter received the Award for Greatest Public Service Benefiting the Disadvantaged, an award given out annually by Jefferson Awards.

== Allegations of sexual abuse and financial improprieties ==
In December 1989, Kevin Kite accused Ritter of having sexual relations with him after meeting him in New Orleans and flying him to New York City to live at Ritter's expense. Kite claimed that he had an eight-month-long sexual relationship with Ritter. He also alleged that Ritter diverted up to $25,000 in Covenant House money to finance the affair. Ritter denied Kite's story, although he said he helped get Kite a scholarship at Manhattan College. In December 1989, the New York Times reported the father of Kevin Kite said his son was "a chronic liar and thief with a 'personality disorder' and a history of hurting those who try to help him." Covenant House officials said they paid Kite's board at Manhattan College, gave him pocket money, and bought him a computer. They also said a Covenant House contact in upstate New York provided Kite with papers that allowed him to take the identity of Tim Warner, a young boy who died of leukemia in 1980.

On January 24, 1990, the Village Voice reported that John Melican, 34, of Seattle, had recounted that from the time he was 16, he had an intermittent 13-year sexual relationship with Ritter. Melican repeated his claims to the New York Times and the Seattle Times, in early 1990, stating that he "was cold and hungry" and "sex was rent."

The New York Times reported that a third man, Darryl Bassile, 31, had approached the paper in mid-January to say he too had had sexual relations with Ritter when a youth. He had complained earlier to the Franciscan friary in Union City, New Jersey, after he heard of Kite's charges, and it started an investigation. A fourth accusation was made by Paul Johnson, 33, an admitted felon who claimed that he was involved with Ritter for six years.

Ritter denied that he had a sexual relationship with any of these men. These allegations were not brought to court, and no charges were filed by the district attorney Robert M. Morgenthau or state attorney general Robert Abrams.

A report prepared for Covenant House by Kroll and Associates and the law firm of Cravath, Swaine & Moore cited fifteen cases of reported sexual contacts between Ritter and youths sheltered at Covenant House or young adults working there as volunteer counselors in what was called the Faith Community. The report did not specifically say all were male, but those who have come forward publicly with allegations about sexual activities have all been male youths. After a five-month investigation, 150 interviews, and the poring over of thousands of pages of documents, the report noted that on the subject of sexual misconduct, "none of the allegations, when viewed individually, can be proved beyond any question" but said, "The cumulative evidence discovered by Kroll in the course of its investigation that Father Ritter engaged in sexual activities with certain residents and made sexual advances toward certain members of the Faith Community is extensive." Its preparation was supervised by Robert J. McGuire, a former New York City Police Commissioner and then senior managing director of Kroll.

Additional allegations surfaced concerning financial improprieties and administrative irregularities at Covenant House. Charles Sennott, a reporter for the New York Post, broke the story, and it became a tabloid sensation into the early months of 1990. The earlier report also cited a number of minor financial irregularities, but added that fundraising was professionally and efficiently managed. Despite mounting a vigorous public relations defense and denying any wrongdoing, Ritter was forced to resign from Covenant House in February 1990.

Ritter left the Franciscan order, but retained his priestly faculties by being incardinated into a diocese in India. Eventually he retired to the small town of Decatur, New York. From 1990 until the end of his life in 1999, he celebrated Mass privately in his home and attended retreats.

Ritter died of cancer at the age of 72.

Preceded by No One (Program Commissioned)	President of Covenant House; 1972-1990	Succeeded by Mary Rose McGeady

== See also ==
- Child sexual abuse in New York City religious institutions
- Catholic Church sexual abuse cases
