= Javier Cárcamo Guzmán =

Guatemalan novelist and painter

Javier Cárcamo
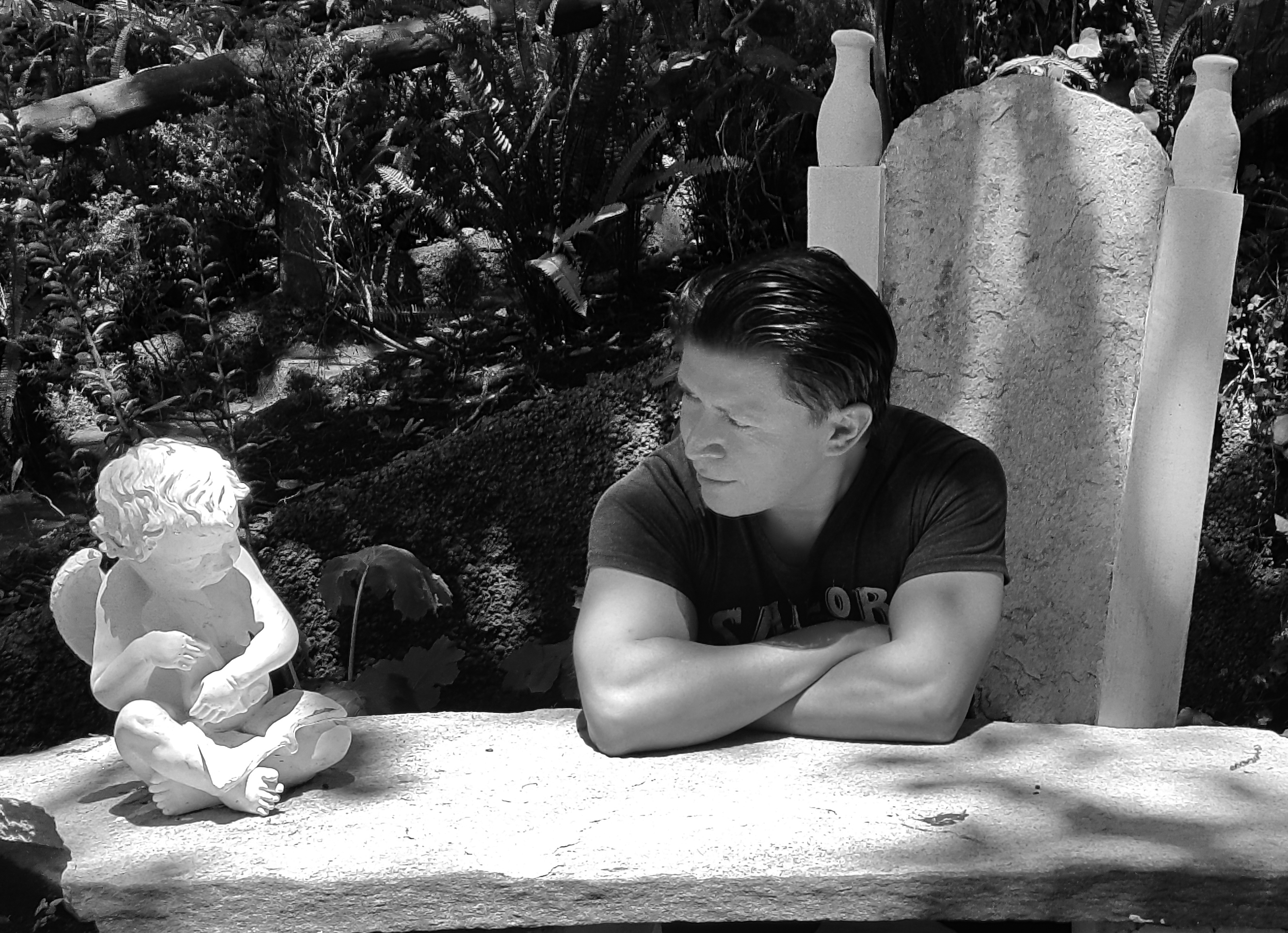
- Javier Cárcamo
- Born: January 25, 1980; Guatemala City, Guatemala
- Education: Roberto Cabrera School of Art, Popular University Universidad de San Carlos de Guatemala Miguel de Cervantes European University
- Occupations: Novelist, Visual artist
- Writing career
- Period: 1999–present
- Genres: Literature, fiction, dark fantasy
- Literary movement: Gothic surrealism

Javier Cárcamo (born January 25, 1980) is a Guatemalan novelist and visual artist. Alongside the muralist Jorge Corleto and other artists, the murals that illustrate the history of art, in the walls of the Popular University of Guatemala, declared as Cultural Heritage of Guatemala, by the Instituto de Antropología e Historia (Institute of Anthropology and History).

== Biography ==
Javier Cárcamo was born in Guatemala, Guatemala, on January 25, 1980. He was born in the suburbs of Guatemala City and studied in the Roberto Cabrera night school of plastic arts, of the Popular University of Guatemala. Cárcamo worked alongside artists such as the muralist Jorge Corleto, the painter Francisco Escobedo and the sculptor Byron Ramírez.

Other of his collections were "Stigio '99", "The Tunnel of the Massacres", "Reliving the Scene of the Crime", "After Hours of Thought" and "Gods You Are", a collection of engravings created with blood. He was a teacher at the Escuela Nacional de Artes Plásticas "Rafael Rodríguez Padilla" (National School of Plastic Arts) (ENAP) and his collection Art is Not Explained was presented to commemorate the centenary of the school.

As a novelist, he has published "Words that you would never dedicate" (Palabras que Nunca Dedicarías), in the year 2003, "What I Wrote While You Were Hiding" (Lo que escribí mientras te escondías), (2008) and "The Apotheosis of the Stones" (2019), a psychological and gothic novel.

== Visual arts exhibitions ==
- Homage Max Saravia Gual 1996
- Stigio'99 1999
- The Tunnel of the Massacres 1999
- Reliving the Scene of the Crime 1999
- Homage Centenary of César Brañas 1999
- After Hours of Thought 2000
- Gods You Are 2001
- ENAP Art exhibit of teachers 2015
- The stray dogs 2017
- Art is Not Explained 2020

== Literature ==
- Words that you would never dedicate A Novel (2003, Lidet; ISBN 978-99939-0-734-3 )
- What I Wrote While You Were Hiding A Novel (2008, Lidet; ISBN 978-99939-0-733-6 )
- Genesis Empresarial Foundation 30th Anniversary (2018, Genesis Empresarial Foundation; ISBN
- The Apotheosis of the Stones: A Novel (2019, Lidet; ISBN 978-9929-787-44-5 )
