= Josefina Alonzo Martínez =

Guatemalan educator

Josefina Alonzo (sometimes Alonso) Martínez (1910-1978) was a Guatemalan educator. Beginning in 1930, she served as principal of the Colegio San Sebastián in Guatemala City, continuing in that position until her death. She was president of the Association of Private Schools, and founded Catholic Action in Guatemala. Five days before her death in 1978, she was made a member of the Order of the Quetzal for her work.
