= Rafael Rodríguez Padilla =

Guatemalan artist (1890–1929)

- Born: January 23, 1890
- Died: January 24, 1929 (aged 39)
- Known for: painting, printmaking, sculpture
- Awards: national award, 1920 * first prize for painting, central American exhibition in Guatemala, September 15, 1921

Rafael Rodríguez Padilla (January 23, 1890 – January 24, 1929) was a Guatemalan painter, printmaker and sculptor. In 1920 he was cofounder and became the first director of the Guatemalan Academia Nacional de Bellas Artes (National Academy of Fine Arts), which merged into the Escuela Nacional de Artes Plásticas "Rafael Rodríguez Padilla".

Rodríguez studied sculpture under the Venezuelan Santiago González (1850–1909) in Guatemala. Afterwards he went to Spain, where he finished his studies under Luis Muriel y López. After his return to Guatemala, he painted his famous self-portrait. He committed suicide in 1929.

== Painting ==
In Spain he became acquainted with the work of the impressionist Joaquín Sorolla, which would influence most of his pictorial production. Although impressionism was already a style that had ceased to be in force in Europe, Rodríguez Padilla professed a deep admiration for the Spanish artist, whose mark can be perceived in all his pictorial production. He returned to Guatemala in 1916.

His painting underwent many changes, all applied with mastery. His first period, before his trip to Spain, was characterized by painting in dark tones. Later, as a great colorist, he knew how to imprint his works with shades and atmospheres of extraordinary luminosity, especially in the portraits of different personalities of the time. Among his most characteristic works are "Desnudo en escorzo", "Desnudo del reflejo", "Portrait of Jaime Sabartés", "Portrait of Dr. Manuel Morales", "Portrait of Juana Padilla" (Central American painting award), "Portrait of Eduardo de La Riva", "Portrait of Adalberto Saravia".

== Selected works ==
- self-portrait, 1915
- Lorenzo Montúfar y Rivera monument in the Avenida La Reforma, 1923
- Francisco Vela monument
- José Milla y Vidaurre monument
- Louis Pasteur monument
- Mausoleum of the Castillo family, (together with Cristóbal Azori), Guatemala City General Cemetery
- art nude
- portrait of Jaime Sabartés, 1923
- portrait of Santiago González
