= Patricia Cruise =

American Roman Catholic nun

Sister Patricia Cruise is an American Roman Catholic nun who served as president of the North American agency Covenant House from 2003 to 2009. In 1979 she graduated from Russell Sage College in Troy, New York with a degree in physical education. In a 2003 speech in Times Square, Cruise accepted her presidency of Covenant House, speaking of the problems of homelessness and runaway youth in Mexico, Canada and the United States.

Preceded by Mary Rose McGeady	President of Covenant House; 2003-2009	Succeeded by Kevin Ryan
