= Obispo =

Obispo is the Spanish and Tagalog word for bishop.

Obispo may also refer to:

== Geography ==
=== Spain ===
- Aldea del Obispo, Spain
- Carrascal del Obispo, Spain
- La Aldea del Obispo, Spain
- Losa del Obispo, Spain

=== United States ===
- San Luis Obispo, California
- San Luis Obispo County, California
- Camp San Luis Obispo
- Mission San Luis Obispo de Tolosa
- San Luis Obispo County Regional Airport
- Cerro San Luis Obispo
- San Luis Obispo Creek

=== Venezuela ===
- Obispos Municipality
- Obispo Ramos de Lora Municipality

=== Elsewhere ===
- Obispo Santistevan Province, Bolivia
- San Juan del Obispo, Guatemala

== People with the name ==
- Armando Obispo (born 1999), Curaçaoan professional footballer
- Pascal Obispo (born 1965), French singer
- Wirfin Obispo (born 1984), Dominican professional baseball player

== Other uses ==
- Obispo "Bishop" Losa, a main character in the FX television series Mayans M.C.
- San Luis Obispo Handicap, a horse race
- Supreme Bishop (Obispo Maximo), title of the leader of the Philippine Independent Church
