= San Juan del Obispo =

Village in Guatemala

Coordinates: 14°32′N 90°43′W

San Juan del Obispo is a small village (pueblo) in Guatemala. It is located in the department of Sacatepéquez, close to the departmental capital, Antigua Guatemala.

The village is famous for holding one of the first Catholic churches in Guatemala. Francisco Marroquín, the first bishop of Guatemala, resided in San Juan del Obispo (hence the name). The church was restored in 1948 by José Luis Álvarez.

A long string of overseas volunteers have lived and worked voluntarily in the village, providing education and a safe environment for children from poor homes in the areas surrounding the volcano side.

== Human resources ==
The village became the 32nd location of Covenant House, who opened up a residence in May 2022. The organization's Latin American branch is called Casa Alianza. The residence is designed for young adolescent boys, survivors of sexual exploitation, trafficking, and irregular migration.
