= Lorenzo Montúfar y Rivera =

Costa Rican politician (1823–1898)

Lorenzo Montúfar
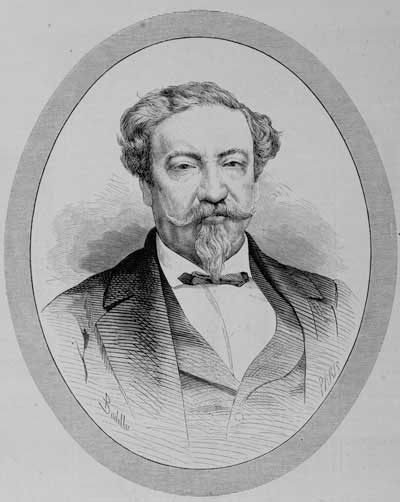
- Montúfar y Rivera in 1876 when he was Minister Plenipotentiary of Guatemala in Madrid
- Born: Lorenzo Montúfar y Rivera; March 11, 1823; Guatemala City, First Mexican Empire
- Died: May 22, 1898 (aged 75); Guatemala City, Guatemala
- Other name: Don Lencho
- Occupations: diplomat, writer, legislature, journalist
- Spouse: Maria de Jesus Madriz Enríquez
- Writing career
- Language: Spanish
- Period: 19th century
- Genre: History
- Literary movement: Liberalism and Positivism

Lorenzo Montúfar y Rivera

Secretary of Foreign Affairs of Costa Rica
- In office 1856–1857

Secretary of Foreign Affairs of Costa Rica
- In office 1870–1873

Vice-chancellor of University of Saint Thomas, Costa Rica

Secretary of Foreign Affairs of Guatemala
- President: Justo Rufino Barrios

Lorenzo Montúfar y Rivera (March 11, 1823 – March 21, 1898) was a Guatemalan politician and lawyer. Superb leader and speaker, helped the liberal regime of Justo Rufino Barrios, served in the Guatemalan legislature, taught in the College of Law of the Universidad Nacional de Guatemala and, towards the end of his life, was a presidential candidate himself losing to general José María Reyna Barrios. He was also Foreign Secretary of Costa Rica in 1856 and from 1870 to 1873, and President of University of Saint Thomas, also in Costa Rica.

== Biography ==
Montúfar y Rivera was the son of Rafael Montúfar y Coronado and Maria del Rosario Rivera. He was married in San José, Costa Rica on January 26, 1851, to Maria de Jesus Madriz Enriquez, the daughter of Juan de los Santos Madriz y Cervantes and Paulina Enríquez Díaz Cabeza de Baca. He graduated as a lawyer from the Pontifica Universidad de San Carlos Borromeo in Guatemala.

Member of the Liberal Party, Montúfar had a deep aversion towards then Guatemalan President Rafael Carrera and then Aycinena family that worked closely to him, and was one of their harshest critics; in spite of it, Carrera esteemed Montúfar deeply and, even though he always had Montufar at hand, never did him any harm. After Carrera rule got reinforced in 1854, Montúfar left Guatemala for Costa Rica, he was Magistrate, Secretary of Foreign Affairs from 1856 to 1857 and from 1870 to 1873, and vice-chancellor of the University of Saint Thomas, where he taught international law and other subjects. He also held the position of Minister of Costa Rica in Great Britain.

In politics he was characterized by his liberal ideology and his extreme anti-clericalism, especially against the Jesuits. (Note: The Jesuits and the other regular orders were leading members of the Conservative Party in Guatemala and had reinforced their power since the Concordat of 1854; the conservatives had ruled Guatemala for thirty years and prevented the formation of liberal Central American Union.) After the triumph of the Liberal Reform of 1871, he returned to Guatemala when Justo Rufino Barrios started his term in office in 1873. Eloquent orator and debater, was then Ambassador of Guatemala in Madrid and participated in the legislature that wrote the Constitution of 1879, in which he had outstanding participation.

Because of his solid integrity, when he was the Guatemalan Foreign Secretary, he defended Guatemalan territoriality against the aggressiveness of general Justo Rufino Barrios, his ministers and diplomats: first, strongly protested the fact Guatemala had lost Chiapas to Mexico; and later, the loss of Soconusco, which saw thousands of miles stripped from Guatemala territory with the consent of both president and cabinet members. This position earned him the exile; Barrios -on the advice of Father Angel Maria Arroyo, Montúfar old personal friend and now one of Barrios' favorites- expelled him from Guatemala, and then, after the death of Barrios in 1885, he was forbidden from return by the government of general Manuel Barillas -where Father Arroyo was serving as Foreign Secretary and Secretary of Education-. Therefore, he then was rejected by both liberal and conservative Guatemalans.

=== 1892 Presidential elections ===
Towards the end of his life, but with all of his will and power still intact, he ran for office in the 1892 presidential elections. It was the first election in Guatemala that allowed the candidates to make propaganda in the local newspapers. The candidates who ran for office were

| Name | Party | Supported by: | Other information |
|---|---|---|---|
| Lorenzo Montúfar | Liberal | Liberal Club | He was the only one of all candidates who made an engraving of his portrait to publish it in the newspapers and was accused of wasting resources for doing this. |
| Francisco Lainfiesta | Liberal | None | Published his government proposal in the Diario de Centro America, taking advantage of the freedom of the Press that existed during Barillas' government. |
| José María Reyna Barrios | Liberal | Liberal Club | Eventual winner. |
| Miguel Enríquez | Conservative | Conservative Party | Enríquez had been a liberal, but became a conservative after the persecution that he suffered from the Barillas administration. (Note: In fact, after the elections he had to run away from his farm in Salama after being accused of sedition; he was captured and executed near Zacapa.) |
| José Carranza Llerena | Conservative | None | Medical staff of President Barillas. |

Barillas Bercian was unique among all liberal presidents of Guatemala between 1871 and 1944: he handed over power to his successor peacefully. When election time approached, he sent for the three Liberal candidates to ask them what their government plan would be. The following anecdote recounts better what happened then:

First arrived lawyer Francisco Lainfiesta, and General Barillas, with the friendliest of smiles, said: «Mr. Lainfiesta: you are one of the candidates in the upcoming elections and perhaps the more likely to win. Therefore, I would like to know what your attitude and your political system of government will be, if you get to win. Especially, I would like to know your attitude about my person; because I have made my mistakes, I do not deny it. I was a simple worker at my carpentry when General Justo Rufino Barrios sent for me to be appointed second presidential designate. I would therefore, Mr. Lainfiesta, know what conduct you will observe towards me." Mr. Lainfiesta said: «General Barillas: if luck would favor me with the election victory, my government will be based on strict adherence to the Constitution; the law would be the law and anyone who has acquired some responsibility, will have to answer for it before the relevant courts. A firm and righteous compliance with the constitutional provisions shall be the standard of my conduct as president». «Very well» said general Barillas, and both parted cordially.

Barillas then brought in Dr. Montúfar and interrogated him in the same or similar way as he had done Mr. Lainfiesta. Dr. Montúfar responded in similar terms as Lainfiesta, stressing his claims to obedience of the Constitution and strict enforcement.

Finally general Reyna Barrios came in; when in the midst of pleasant conversation, General Barillas repeated his question, and Reyna replied, with a sincere smile: «We should not even talk about that, general; because you and I are the same. Rest assured that I will know how to respect and protect you.» And then both shook hands with effusion. By the election period, the first two days of voting favored Lainfiesta. But by the third day, a huge column of Quetzaltenango and Totonicapán Indigenous people came down from the mountains to vote for general Reyna Barrios. The official agents did their job: Reyna was elected president and, not to offend the losing candidates, Barillas gave them checks to cover the costs of their presidential campaigns. Reyna Barrios, of course, received nothing, but he went on to become President on March 15, 1892.

== Death ==
"After noble effort and struggle without a second,
At last the glorious Lean back against ...
Your desire is fulfilled: the simiento
Germina and deep groove »

— Alirio Diaz Guerra
New York City, 1898

Montufar died in Guatemala City during the early morning of May 22, 1898. Despite being his passing expected by his fellow Guatemalans -since he had been visibly ill for a while-, there was deep sadness in the capital city. There were large demonstrations at his funeral, and government officials praised him in the local newspapers. A hundred years after his birth, the government of José María Orellana erected a monument to his memory at the Avenida Reforma; the sculptor was the renowned Guatemalan artist Rafael Rodríguez Padilla, and this was the first bronze sculpture produced in Guatemala.

== Works ==
Owner of vast culture, Montufar was corresponding member of the Royal Spanish Academy of Language.

- "History of Central America 'in 1920, following the overthrow of licensed Manuel Estrada Cabrera, the Unionist party -made by several Guatemalan conservative leaders ordered the cremated and destroy all copies of this work, since extolled the virtues and supuestas—true liberals Central- American leaders. Even the copy that existed in the National Archives of Guatemala was extracted and used to wrap grocery stores
- "Autobiographical Memories'. 1893

== quotes ==
| "The laws that determine the relationships of men with the Creator, do not need the approval of the civil government. " — Lorenzo Montúfar | "For our work in politics to be solid and durable, we need to build it accurately from its foundations up, so that it can stand on the virtue of its own forces against the false ambitions of personal interests. " — Lorenzo Montúfar |

== Gallery ==
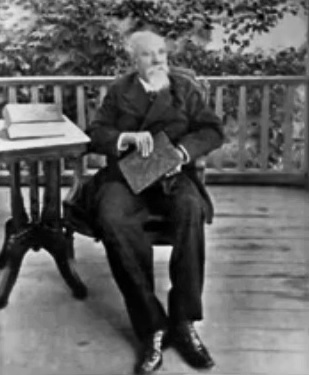
Lorenzo Montúfar towards the end of his life.

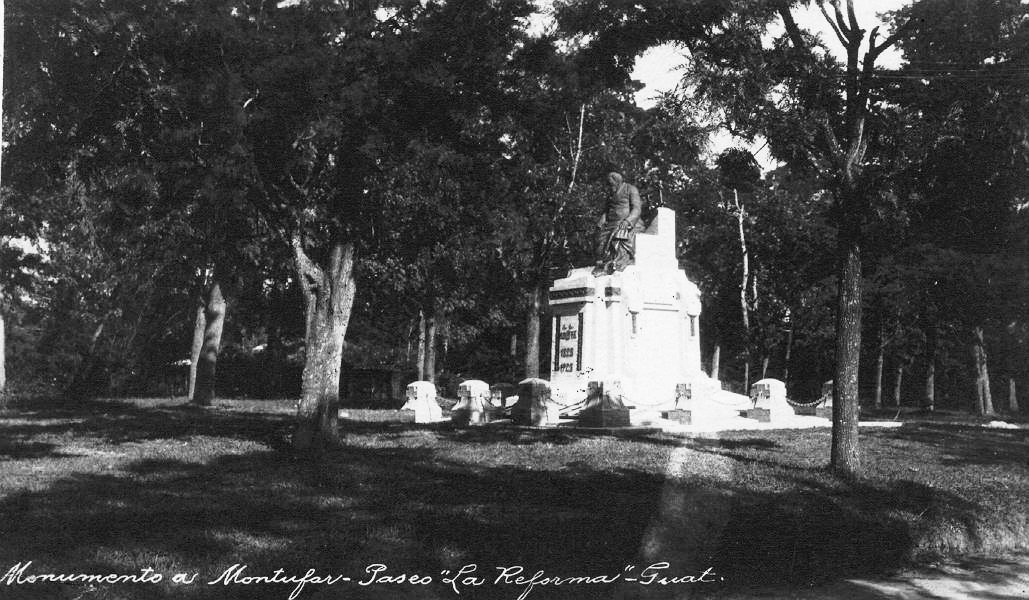
Doctor Montúfar monument celebrating his birthday centennial; built by Guatemalan sculptor Rafael Rodríguez Padilla during José María Orellana presidency. Photograph from 1925.

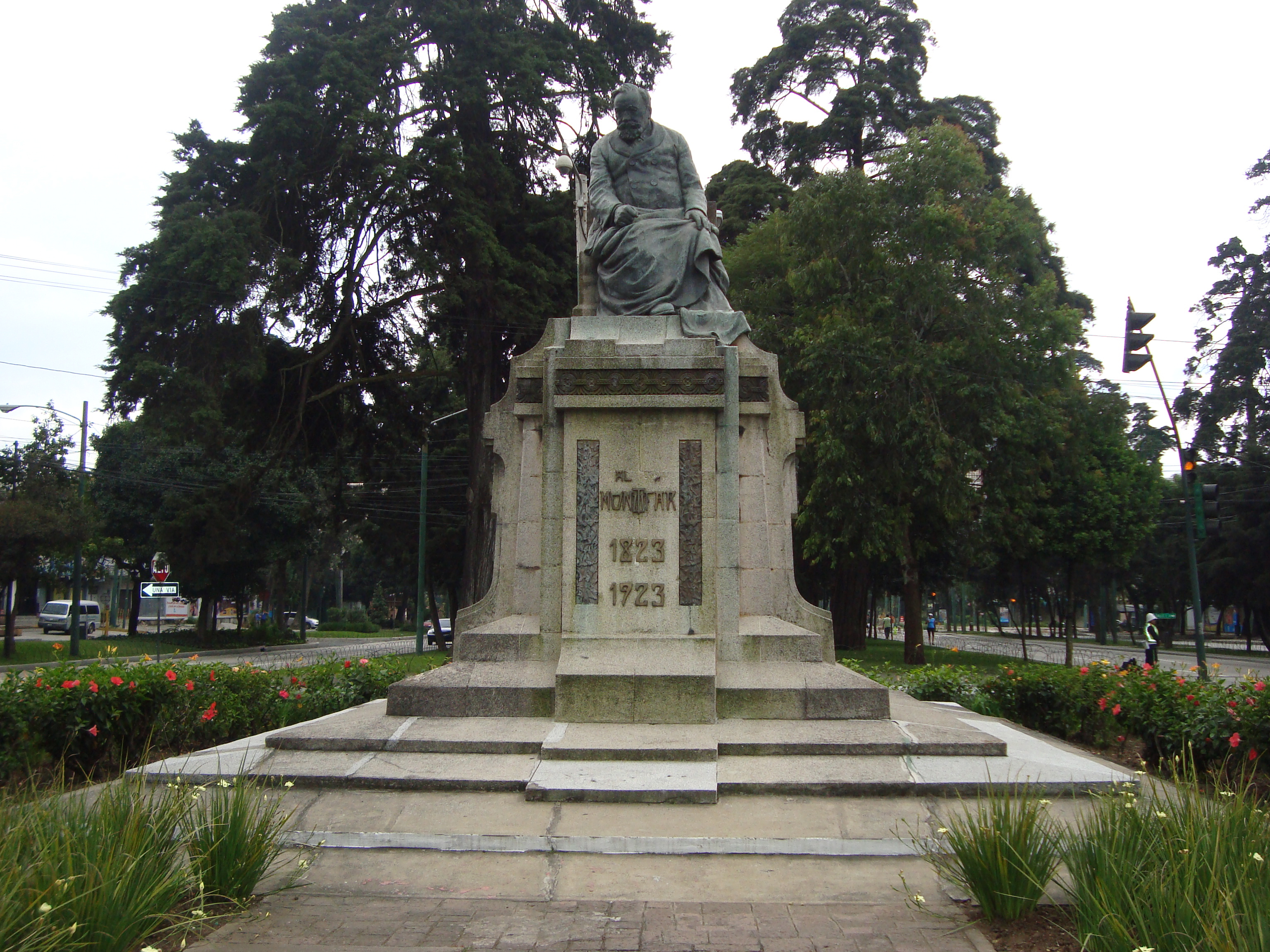
Dr. Montúfar monument in 2010

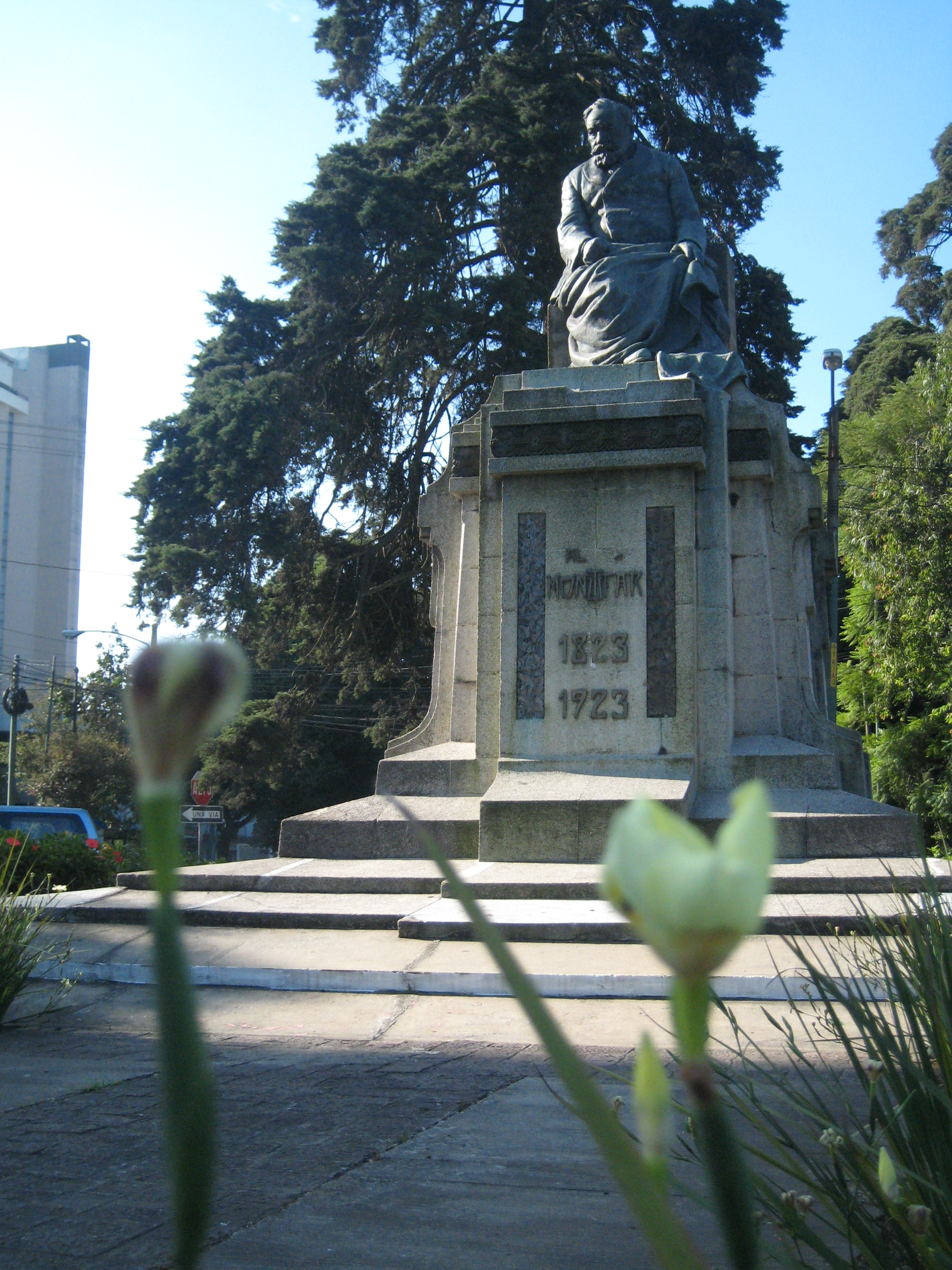

== See also ==
- Justo Rufino Barrios
- Rafael Carrera

== Bibliography ==
- Castellanos, Lorena (2014). "Vida y obra de José María Reyna Barrios". Francisco Marroquín University (in Spanish). Guatemala.
- De los Ríos, Efraín (1948). Ombres contra Hombres (in Spanish) (2nd ed.). México: Fondo de la Cultura de la Universidad de México.
- Fernández Alfaro, Joaquin Alberto (2014). El Canciller Montúfar (in Spanish) (1st. ed.). San José, Costa Rica: Instituto Manuel María de Peralta, Ministerio de Relaciones Exteriores y Culto de Costa Rica. p. 384.
- Hernández de León, Federico (1959). "El capitulo de las efemerides". La Hora (in Spanish). Guatemala.
- La Ilustración Española y Americana (1876). "Doctor don Lorenzo Montúfar y Rivera, Ministro plenipotenciario de Guatemala en Madrid". Fundación Joaquín Díaz (in Spanish). 20 (79).
- Mendoza, Juan Manuel (1946). Enrique Gómez Carrillo: estudio crítico-biográfico; su vida, su obra y su época (in Spanish) (2nd. ed.). Guatemala: Tipografía Nacional.
- Montúfar, Lorenzo (1893). "'notions of international law and laws of war, for the Central American armies". archive.org.
