= Mary Rose McGeady =

Mary Rose McGeady, DC (June 28, 1928, Hazleton, Pennsylvania - September 13, 2012, Albany, New York) was an American Catholic religious sister with the Daughters of Charity of Saint Vincent de Paul who was widely acknowledged for her work with homeless youth in the United States. She was the director of Covenant House from 1990 to 2003.

Preceded by Bruce Ritter	President of Covenant House; 1990-2003	Succeeded by Patricia Cruise
