= Covenant House =

American non-profit organization

Covenant House International
- Founded: New York City, U.S. 1971; 55 years ago
- Founder: Father Bruce Ritter
- Type: 501(c)(3) nonprofit charitable organization
- Location(s): U.S. and international headquarters in New York City
- Services: Aid to youth experiencing homelessness and human trafficking.
- President and CEO: William "Bill" Bedrossian
- Key people: Kevin Ryan; Sister Mary Rose McGeady
- Website: Covenant House

Covenant House is a large, 501(c)(3) nonprofit charitable organization in the Americas, whose goal is to provide safe housing and holistic care to youth ages 16–21 experiencing homelessness and survivors of human trafficking. Covenant House was officially incorporated in 1972, and offers services including healthcare, educational support/GED preparation/college scholarships, job readiness and workforce development programs, substance use treatment and prevention programs, legal services, mental health services, services for young families, and transitional living programs.

== Services ==
Covenant House aids young people facing homelessness and survivors of human trafficking with a number of data-supported programs. Their doors are open 24/7 in 34 cities across six countries, and its programs are designed to empower young people to overcome adversity, and achieve independence. In 2022, Covenant House provided housing for, on average, 2,000 youth each night. Covenant House residential programs cared for 7,700 young people in FY22.

In addition to food, shelter, and clothing, Covenant House offers outreach, medical and mental health care, education and job readiness programs, workforce development and job placement, substance use treatment and prevention, civil legal aid services, young family programs, transitional and supportive apartment-living programs, and life-skills training.

Covenant House's doors are always open to all young people who need housing and help, regardless of their race, religion, sexual orientation, or gender identity or expression. To achieve this, Covenant House's programs are informed by the True Colors Inclusion Assessment and certified by Praesidium.

== History ==
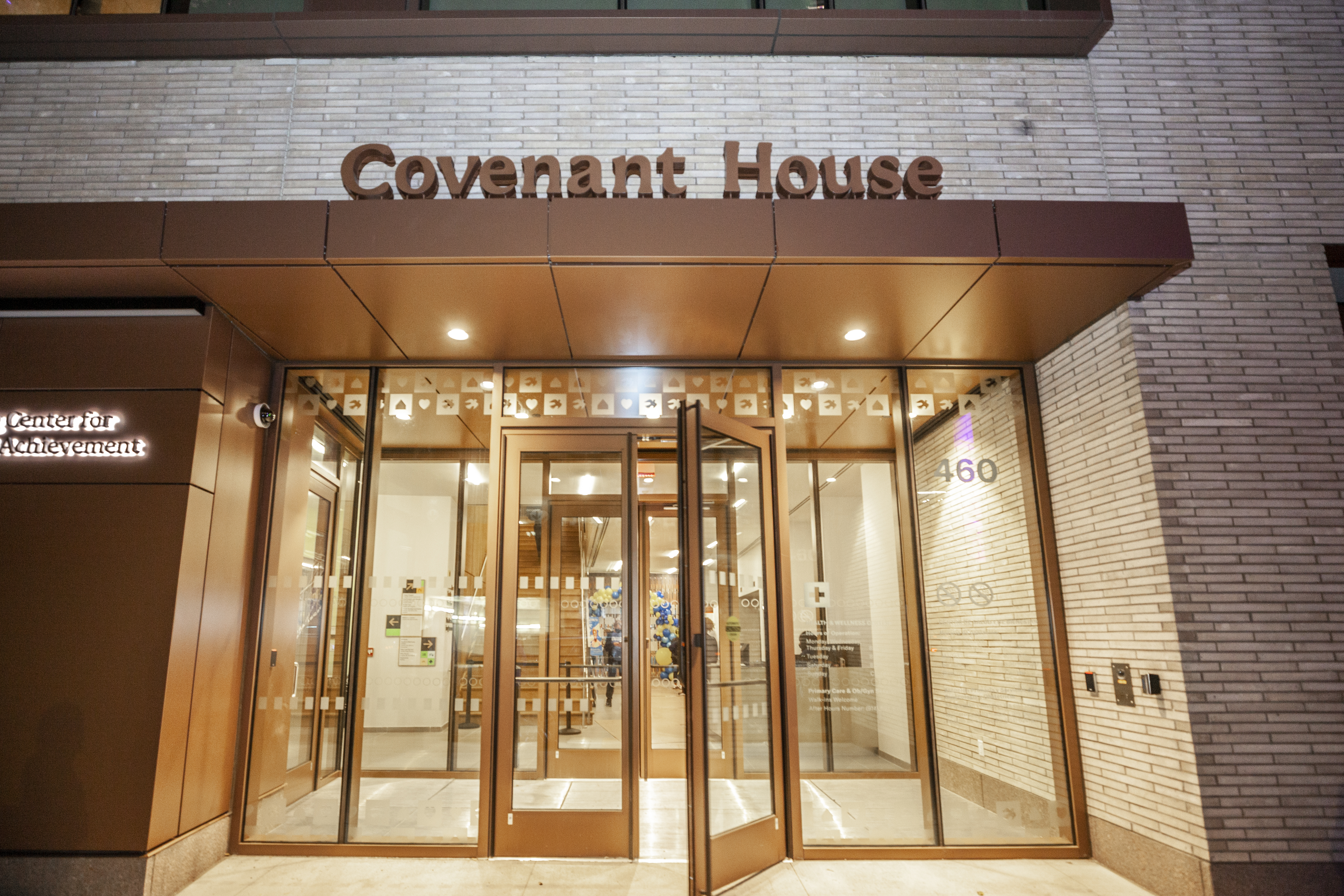
Headquarters in New York City

In the late 1960s, the Reverend Bruce Ritter, a Franciscan priest, retired from his job as a professor at Manhattan College to begin a new ministry serving the city's poor. Joined by colleague Father James Fitzgibbon, he moved into a dilapidated tenement building in New York City's East Village. With volunteers, including friends, former students, and neighbors, he began an effort to help homeless and runaway young people. By 1970, Father Fitzgibbon had moved on to other ministries, but Father Ritter remained. Adrian Gately, Patricia Kennedy, and Paul Frazier joined him to create the Covenant Community. In 1972, Covenant House was officially incorporated with its first intake center established at 504 LaGuardia Place.

Now, as an established nonprofit organization, Covenant House began to fundraise to shelter youth facing homelessness in Lower Manhattan and on Staten Island. In 1976, Father Ritter announced plans to create a multi-service center near the Port Authority Bus Terminal. Covenant House then acquired a group of buildings on West 44th Street and moved its administrative offices to the new location, which moved into a retrofitted cluster of buildings on West 41st Street in 1979.

Throughout the late 1970s, Covenant House expanded its social service programs in New York City and began to branch out to other cities in 1980. In a widely publicized case, Ritter was forced to retire from Covenant House in 1990 after extensive allegations of sexual misconduct and minor financial irregularities. Following his departure, Covenant House grew, led by Sister Mary Rose McGeady (1990–2003), Sister Tricia Cruise (2003–2008), Kevin Ryan (2009–2023), and Bill Bedrossian (2023-Present), opening centers in 34 cities in the United States, Canada, and Latin America.

== Locations ==
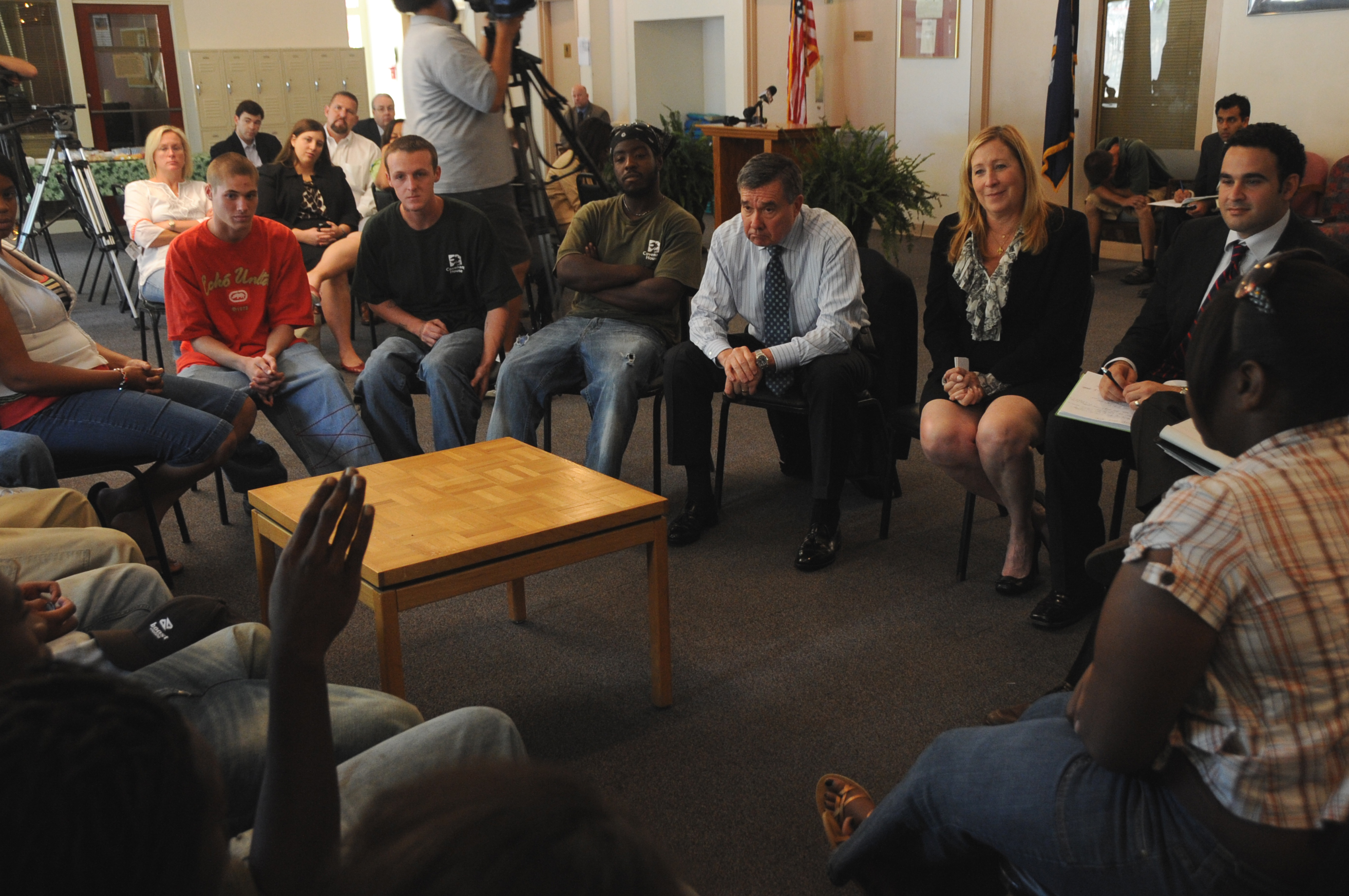
Then-Drug Czar Gil Kerlikowske speaks with staff and patients at the Covenant House.

As of January 2023, Covenant House operates shelters in the United States in:

- Anchorage, AK
- Anaheim, CA
- Hayward, CA
- Los Angeles, CA
- Oakland, CA
- Santa Clara, CA
- Washington, DC
- Fort Lauderdale, FL
- Orlando, FL
- Atlanta, GA
- Chicago, IL
- New Orleans, LA
- Prince George’s County, MD
- Detroit, MI
- Grand Rapids, MI
- St. Louis, MO
- Asbury Park, NJ
- Atlantic City, NJ
- Elizabeth, NJ
- Montclair, NJ
- Newark, NJ
- New York, NY
- Philadelphia, PA
- York, PA
- Houston, TX

and, outside the United States:

- Vancouver, Canada
- Coatepeque, Guatemala
- Guatemala City, Guatemala
- San Juan Del Obispo, Guatemala
- San Pedro Sula, Honduras
- Tegucigalpa, Honduras
- Mexico City, Mexico
- Managua, Nicaragua

== Presidents ==
Despite having a board of directors, Covenant House's public face has tended to be its presidents. Father Bruce Ritter founded Covenant House and served as president from 1972 to his resignation in 1990. He was succeeded by Sister Mary Rose McGeady, D.C., who served from 1990 to 2003. In 2003 the board of directors elected Sister Patricia A. Cruise, S.C.. In addition to their administrative duties, the presidents of Covenant House have been known for their fundraising letters telling the stories of the youth Covenant House serves, some of which have been collected into books. Sr. Patricia A. Cruise resigned her position as president of Covenant House International in 2008. Kevin Ryan, formerly the Child Advocate of New Jersey, became president in 2009, and retired from the position on February 12, 2023. William “Bill” Bedrossian, former CEO of Covenant House California, became CEO & president of Covenant House International on February 13, 2023.

=== Controversy ===
In February 1990, Covenant House founder and President Bruce Ritter was forced to step down in the wake of allegations of sexual and financial misconduct, beginning with the accusations of Kevin Kite, who accused Ritter of sexual abuse. Ritter resigned but was never charged with sexual abuse. Soon after, more accusations surfaced. Four men came forward publicly claiming to have been in sexual relationships with Ritter for years, including multiple who stated the relationships started when they were minors receiving services through Covenant House. A report later prepared for Covenant House counted a total of 15 reported cases of sexual acts between Ritter and youth and young adults who were living or volunteering at the shelter.

Then-Manhattan District Attorney Robert M. Morgenthau began looking into possible financial improprieties or the use of false documentation by Covenant House officials. The Manhattan District Attorney's office announced that it was ending its investigation of Ritter's alleged financial misconduct and would not file criminal charges, on the day after his resignation.

Covenant House's board of directors immediately commissioned an independent investigation conducted by private investigative firm Kroll Associates, and the law firm Cravath, Swaine & Moore. After a five-month investigation, 150 interviews, and the examination of thousands of pages of documents, their report noted that on the subject of sexual misconduct, "none of the allegations, when viewed individually, can be proved beyond any question." At the same time the report confirmed, the "cumulative" evidence against Father Ritter was "extensive."

Their report also cited a number of minor financial irregularities, but added that fundraising was professionally and efficiently managed. Sister Mary Rose McGeady, then associate director of Catholic Charities for the Diocese of Brooklyn, became President of Covenant House, instituting both financial and program-related reforms.

== See also ==
- Casa Alianza
