= Kevin Ryan (Australian rules footballer) =

Australian rules footballer

Personal information
- Full name: Kevin Ryan
- Born: 9 April 1937
- Died: 11 June 1999 (aged 62)
- Original team: Hamilton

Playing career^{1}
| Years | Club | Games (Goals) |
| 1958 | Carlton | 1 (0) |
- ^{1} Playing statistics correct to the end of 1958.

Kevin Ryan (9 April 1937 – 11 June 1999) was an Australian rules footballer who played with Carlton in the Victorian Football League (VFL).
