= Hush (novel) =

2010 novel by Eishes Chayil

- Author: Eishes Chayil, a pseudonym
- Language: English
- Genre: Fiction
- Publisher: Walker Books for Young Readers
- Publication date: September 14, 2010
- Publication place: United States
- Media type: Print (Hardback)
- Pages: 368
- ISBN: 0-8027-2088-9

Hush is a 2010 novel written under the pseudonym Eishes Chayil. In August 2011, the author revealed herself as Judy Brown, the daughter of Ruthie Lichtenstein, the publisher of Hamodia. It deals with sexual abuse in the Ger Hasidic Jewish community of Boro Park, Brooklyn, and is based on experiences the author claims to have witnessed. Hush was selected as a Best Book of the Year by Kirkus Reviews.
