= New Jersey Department of Children and Families =

State agency of New Jersey, United States

Department of Children and Families
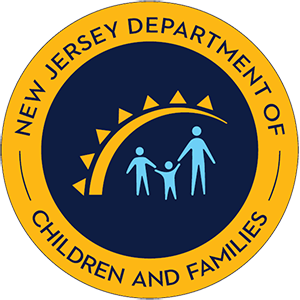
- Seal of the NJDCF

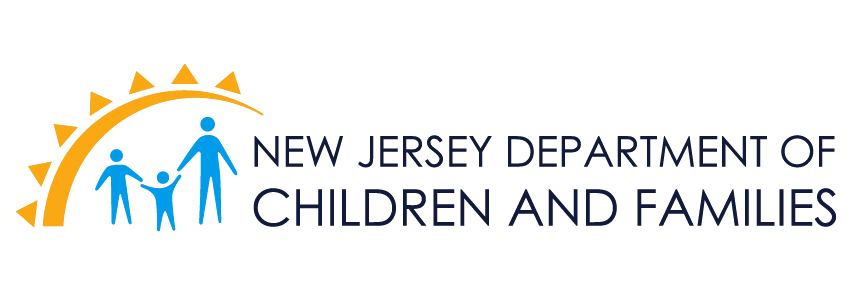
- Logo of the NJDCF

Agency overview
- Formed: July 1, 2006; 20 years ago
- Preceding agency: Department of Human Services
- Jurisdiction: Government of New Jersey
- Headquarters: 50 East State Street Trenton, New Jersey
- Employees: 6,600
- Annual budget: US$2.4 billion (FY2027) (36% federal)
- Agency executive: Joseph Ribsam, Acting Commissioner
- Website: https://www.nj.gov/dcf/about/

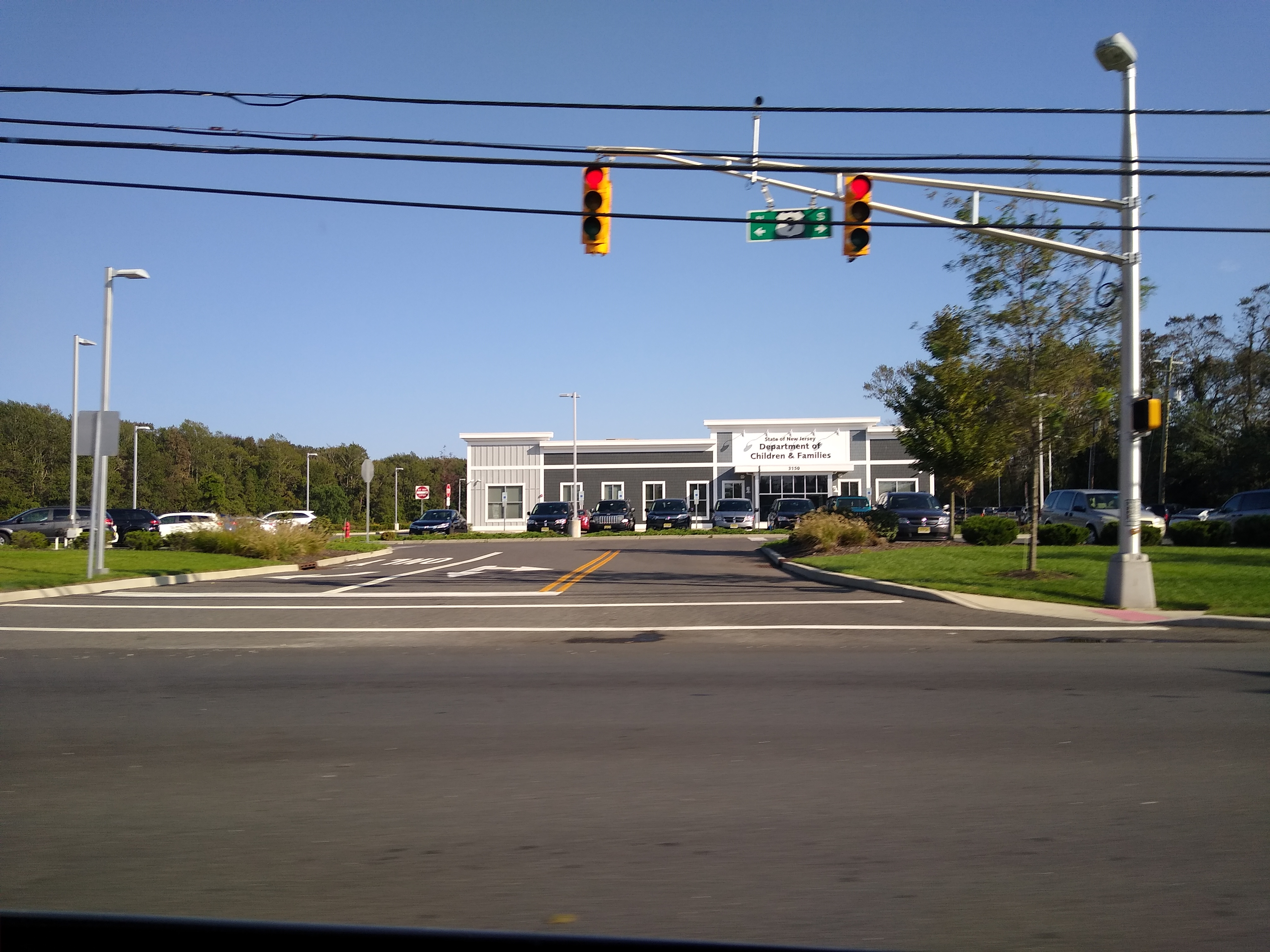
Office in Rio Grande, Middle Township, New Jersey

The New Jersey Department of Children and Families (DCF) is the state government agency dedicated to ensuring the safety, well-being and success of children, youth, families and communities in New Jersey through comprehensive oversight and programming.

== History ==
In 2006, New Jersey Governor Jon Corzine proposed a revamping of the statewide child welfare system, which was under the auspices of the Department of Human Services, and creation of a new cabinet-level department. He selected Kevin Ryan to lead as the first commissioner. The DCF was created in July 2006 with the dedicated goal to serve and safeguard the most vulnerable children and families in the state. It has evolved to be more inclusive of the extended community. As of 2018, there were approximately 6,600 employees.

== Divisions ==
- Child Protection and Permanency
- Children's System of Care
- Family and Community Partnerships
- Adolescent Services
- Advocacy
- Education
- Licensing
- Performance Management and Accountability
- Institutional Abuse Investigation Unit
- Women
- Strategic Development
- Office of Family Voice

== Related legislation ==
- 2006: Department of Children and Families Act, P.L. 2006, c. 47

== See also ==
- Governorship of Chris Christie
- Governorship of Phil Murphy
