= Kevin A. Ryan =

Kevin Albert Ryan (born 7 October 1932) is the founder and director emeritus of the Center for the Advancement of Ethics and Character at Boston University.

== Career ==
As a naval officer, Ryan attended Instructors School and taught. When he left active duty, he entered Columbia University, obtained a master's degree in the teaching of English and taught this subject at Suffern High School, Suffern, New York, for four years. It was toward the end of this period that he met his future wife, Marilyn Snydar, an English teacher from a nearby school.

A former high school English teacher, Ryan has taught on the faculties of Stanford University, the University of Chicago, Harvard University, Ohio State University, and the University of Lisbon.

Books Ryan has written or edited include Moral Education: It Comes with the Territory; Reclaiming Our Schools: A Handbook for Teaching Character, Academics, and Discipline (with Ed Wynne); and Building Character in Schools: Practical Ways to Bring Moral Instruction to Life (with Karen Bohlin).

Ryan has written and edited twenty books, written over one hundred articles, and developed several sets of instructional materials. He has consulted on moral education and teacher education for the U. S. Department of Education and the state departments of education of New York, Massachusetts, California, Georgia, South Carolina, New Hampshire, Maryland, Alabama and Virginia. Professor Ryan has worked overseas with educators in Portugal, Germany, Egypt, Finland, Australia, Japan, Korea, Taiwan, and Spain.

== Honors ==
In 1998, Ryan was awarded the National Award of Distinction by the University of Pennsylvania Graduate School of Education and the 1998 Award for Educational Excellence by the Paideia Society.

In 2003, Pope John Paul II appointed Ryan to the Pontifical Academy of Social Sciences.
