= Collingswood Boys =

American child abuse victims

Picture taken at the Come Alive New Testament Church of Medford, New Jersey. Raymond and Vanessa Jackson and the adopted and foster children in their care. Bruce Jackson, aged 19 years and weighing 45 pounds (20 kg), is standing next to Vanessa Jackson; the other three boys being starved are standing together

The Collingswood Boys are four boys who were starved by their adoptive parents, Raymond and Vanessa Jackson, while living in Collingswood, New Jersey. The Jacksons were arrested in October 2003 and indicted by a grand jury on 8 counts of aggravated assault and 20 counts of endangerment for failing to provide adequate nutrition, medical and dental care, and a clean environment for the four boys, who ranged in age from 10 to 19 as of May 2004.

The case came to public attention after a neighbor found the Jacksons' 19-year-old adoptive son, Bruce, rummaging through their garbage cans for food at three o'clock in the morning on October 10, 2003, and called 911. The Collingswood Police Department responded to the call and found Bruce, who weighed approximately 45 pounds (20 kg) at the time and stood only 4 feet (1.2 m) tall; he was disoriented, shoeless, covered in bruises, cold, and extremely malnourished, and the police believed him to be about seven years old. They then went to the Jackson home, where they found his adoptive brothers, who also appeared malnourished: Michael, age 9 and 23 pounds (10 kg); Terrell, age 10 and 28 pounds (13 kg); and Tre'Shawn, age 14 and 40 pounds (18 kg).

The adoptive father, Raymond Jackson, 51, died of complications from a stroke on November 14, 2004, before the case went to trial. In an interview with a New York magazine shortly before his death, Jackson claimed that 45-pound Bruce Jackson had often gorged himself on food and had lied about conditions in the home.

Until the 911 call, no one had reported concerns about the children, although they were often seen in public, including at the Come Alive New Testament Church in Medford, New Jersey, where Raymond and Vanessa Jackson and their adoptive and foster children, including the four boys, always sat in the front row for services. They also attended church picnics and the boys sang gospel on stage. The Jacksons blamed the emaciated conditions of the four boys on medical problems.

The Jacksons had six adopted children: Bruce; Tre'Shawn, 14; Terrell, 10; Michael, 9; Keziah, 12, and Jacee, 5. They also planned to adopt a 10-year-old foster child, Breanna. They received an annual subsidy of approximately $30,000 to care for their foster and adopted children.

Dozens of friends and acquaintances thought that the Jacksons were model parents who adopted troubled children with a host of medical problems – children no one else wanted. They believed that it was their duty and that Jesus would guide them.

Vanessa Jackson, the adoptive mother, eventually pleaded guilty and was sentenced to seven years in prison. She was released from prison on February 24, 2010. She completed just over four years of a seven-year sentence at the Edna Mahan Correctional Facility for Women in Clinton, New Jersey. Bruce gained 100 pounds (45 kg) within a year after his removal from the Jacksons' home.
