= Order of the Quetzal =

Highest honor award in Guatemala

Order of the Quetzal Orden del Quetzal
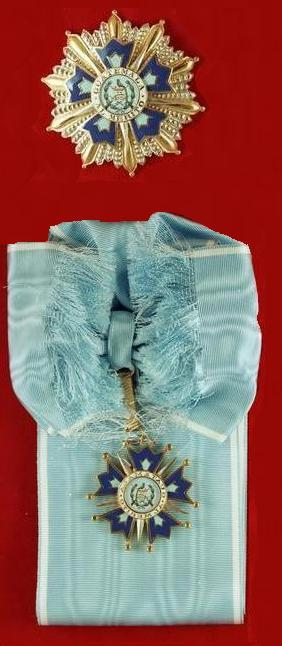
- The star and the cordon of the order (Grand Cross Rank)

Awarded by Guatemala
- Type: Order
- Awarded for: artistic, civic, humanitarian, or scientific merit
- Status: Currently constituted
- Sovereign: President of Guatemala
- Grades: Chain; Grand Cross; Grand Officer; Commander; Officer; Knight
- Ribbon bar for Grand Cross Ribbon bar for Grand Officer Ribbon bar for Commander Ribbon bar for Officer Ribbon bar for Knight

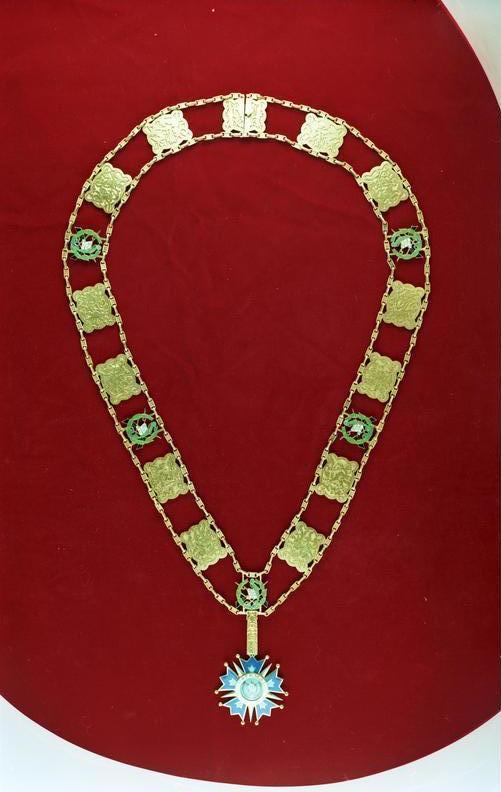
Collar of the order

The Order of the Quetzal (Spanish: Orden del Quetzal) is Guatemala's highest honor.

== History and award conditions ==
Established in 1936, it is bestowed by the Government of Guatemala. The award acknowledges officials of nations, organizations and other entities whose artistic, civic, humanitarian, or scientific works merit special recognition.

== Grades ==
- Collar: Golden chain around the neck
- Grand Cross: Badge hanging from a sash from right shoulder to left hip and star on the left chest
- Grand Officer: Badge hanging from a sash around the neck and non-enamelled star on the left chest.
- Commander: Badge hanging from a sash around the neck
- Officer: Badge hanging from a ribbon with rosette on the left chest
- Knight: Badge hanging from a ribbon without rosette on the left chest. The badge is not golden.

== Insignia ==
The badge is a ten-pointed cross with five branches and a medallion representing the coat of arms of Guatemala. The branches are light blue with a wide dark blue border. On the white ring is inscribed "AL MERITO GUATEMALA". The ribbon is light blue with thin white borders.

== Recipients ==
Year	Awarded to
1936	Benito Mussolini
1937	Maximiliano Hernández Martínez
1949	Edwin Jackson Kyle
1950	Juan Domingo Perón
1956	Chiang Kai-Shek
1959	Golda Meir
1958	Roberto González Goyri
1960	Flavio Herrera
1960	Frederic Rosengarten
1960	General Manuel Francisco Sosa Avila
1961	Paul Carpenter Standley
1962	François Durafour
1962	Martha Bolaños de Prado
1963	Johannes Marré
1963	Edwin M. Shook
1968	Augustus Ledyard Smith
1975	J. Eric S. Thompson
1976	Carmen Lind Pettersen
1977	Augusto Pinochet
1977	Francis Robicsek
1978	Josefina Alonzo Martínez
1980	Tatiana Proskouriakoff
1980	Kjell Magne Bondevik
1985	Lee Teng-hui
1987	Richard von Weizsäcker
1987	Julio Abril Valdez
1991	Yuri Knorozov
1992	Fredrick Chien
1995	Michel Gabaudan
1995	Diego Molina Flores
1998	Teodoro Palacios Flores
2001	Jacques Diouf
2003	René Lara
2004	Michael D. Coe
2004	Jorge Briz
2005	Isabel Gutiérrez de Bosch
1957, 2009	Alberto Fuentes Mohr
2009	Juan Carlos Plata
2009	Fidel Castro
2010	Carlos Castresana
2011	Rodolfo Mac Donald
2011	Leonel Fernández
2011	Stephen D. Houston
2011	Julia Isabel Urrutia Castellanos
2013	Ricardo Arjona
2013	National Geographic Society
2013	Rotary Foundation
2013	Michael Wiley McCord, M.D.
2014	Luis von Ahn
2015	Luis Argueta
2017	Fernando Mazariegos, Edmond Mulet, Richard Hansen
2017	Tsai Ing-wen
2017	Vehbi Esgel Etensel
?	José Antonio Padilla Segura
?	Julio María Sanguinetti
?	Rafael Arévalo Martínez
?	Raphael Girard
?	Alfredo Stroessner
?	Jorge Rafael Videla
?	Sophia of Spain and Juan Carlos I of Spain
2020	Vicente Gonzalez
2022	Andrés Manuel López Obrador
2023	Fredy Archila
2024	Armando Cáceres Estrada
2024	Orquesta Sinfónica Nacional de Guatemala
2025	Luis Almagro
2025	Alfredo MacKenney
