= Kevin Ryan (charity executive) =

American businessman (born 1967)

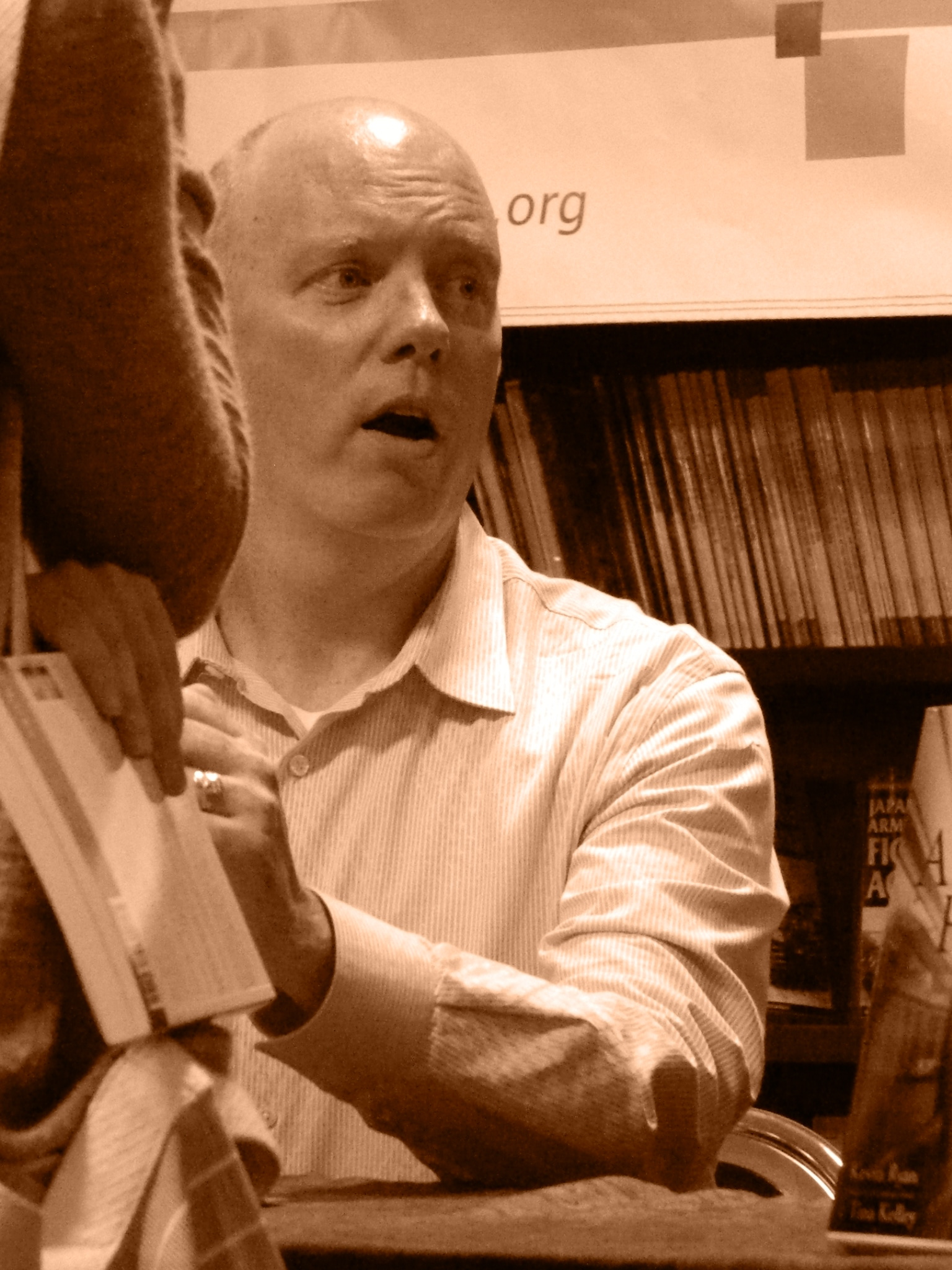
- Ryan in 2013
- Born: 1967 (age 58–59)
- Education: Catholic University of America (BA); Georgetown University Law Center (JD); New York University School of Law (LL.M)
- Occupation: Children's welfare advocate
- Spouse: Clare
- Children: 6

Kevin Ryan (born 1967), was the president and CEO of Covenant House International, one of the largest charities in North and Central America serving homeless, trafficked and sexually exploited youth.

Along with former New York Times reporter Tina Kelley, he is the co-author of the national best seller, Almost Home: Helping Kids from Homelessness to Hope, which chronicles the struggles and triumphs of six homeless teenagers as they face exploitation, addiction, human trafficking and pregnancy.

He is a frequent contributor to the Huffington Post, where his blog on human trafficking and children's welfare is a staple of the Impact Section.

Covenant House reports that it reaches more than 50,000 children and young people annually in United States, Canada, Mexico, Guatemala, Honduras and Nicaragua. The charity's international human rights work has been awarded the Conrad Hilton Humanitarian Award, the Olof Palme Award, the United States Department of State Hero Citation, and the Guatemala Hands of Peace Award. Under Ryan's leadership, Covenant House has also been a leader for social change, building an international "Sleep Out" movement that has included thousands of business executives, Broadway stars, political leaders and young professionals to experience a night of homelessness in solidarity with homeless young people across six countries.

Ryan, his wife and six children have been residents of Fair Haven, New Jersey.

== Career with Covenant House ==
After receiving his Juris Doctor degree from the Georgetown University Law Center in 1992, Ryan started a legal aid program for homeless youth at Covenant House in New York City and expanded the program to reach teenagers in the Bronx, Brooklyn, Atlantic City and Newark, NJ over the next ten years.

While at Covenant House, Ryan co-wrote and lobbied for the New Jersey Homeless Youth Act with homeless advocate Lisa Eisenbud, which was enacted by the New Jersey Legislature and signed into law by Gov. Christie Whitman in 1999. The act allowed children in crisis to access shelter for a limited period of time, while shelter staff tried to contact their caregivers or the child welfare system. Previously, children could not stay in a shelter without the permission of their parents or a judge.

Ryan left Covenant House for a period of time to serve as New Jersey's first Child Advocate, first commissioner of Children and Families and, with the United Nations, as the first chief of staff to the Secretary General's first special envoy for malaria. In January 2009, he returned to Covenant House to take over as its 4th international president since the organization's founding in 1972, and the first who is not a member of a Roman Catholic religious order. He described it as "coming home," referencing the decade he had worked as an advocate for homeless youth at Covenant House from 1992 to 2002.

When it comes to homelessness, New York City has reached an all-time high with thousands of individuals who are living on the streets or in shelters throughout the city. On March 22, 2014, Young Professional Sleep Out with Covenant House had its second sleep out by the shelter and promoted awareness of homeless throughout the New York. Thousands participated and helped bring the attention to businesses, government, and media outlets to realize that the issue affects thousands of individuals every year. Covenant House helps millions of people through the U.S. and other parts of the world and together raises money and awareness to help combat homelessness in this world.

== Career as child advocate ==
From 2003 to 2006, Ryan served as New Jersey's first Child Advocate where he exposed a series of high-profile failings in the State juvenile justice system, including the illegal detention of hundreds of children awaiting mental health care.

Ryan brought to public light conditions of dangerous overcrowding in a number of youth detention centers, including the jailing in small, crowded cells of nonviolent youth, such as runaways, with violent offenders, sparking a rash of suicide attempts among detained young people. As Child Advocate, he also investigated the role the government played in placing and supervising four young boys in the care of an adoptive family who later starved them, leading to a wave of national attention and a call for meaningful reform of the New Jersey child welfare system.

His advocacy on behalf of children in the foster care system before the United States Congress and on the CBS television show 60 Minutes brought renewed national attention to the need for reform of those systems. In 2006, New Jersey Governor Jon Corzine nominated Ryan to lead a turnaround of the statewide child welfare system as first commissioner of the New Jersey Department of Children and Families. During his tenure, New Jersey set new state records for adoptions, net gains in foster families and safety for children in foster care.

== Recognition ==
Ryan is the recipient of Harvard Law School's Wassertstein Fellowship, the Skadden Fellowship, and several honorary degrees, including one from Georgian Court University, where he delivered the commencement address more than 80 years after his paternal grandmother graduated valedictorian in the university's first campus graduation to include women, in Lakewood, New Jersey.

Preceded by Patricia A. Cruise	President of Covenant House; 2009-present	Succeeded by Current Incumbent
