= Museo Nacional de Arte Moderno "Carlos Mérida" =

Art museum in Guatemala City, Guatemala

Coordinates: 14°35′51″N 90°31′44″W

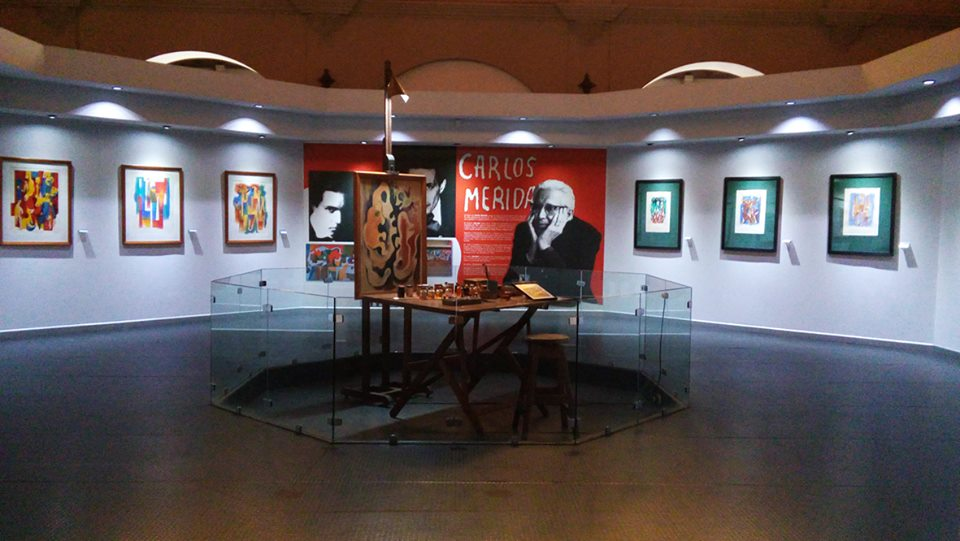
- Established: 1975
- Location: Guatemala City, Guatemala
- Type: Modern art museum

The Museo Nacional de Arte Moderno "Carlos Mérida" is a national museum of modern art in Guatemala City, named after Carlos Mérida.

== History ==
The current museum was established in 1975. The history of the Museo Nacional de Arte Moderno "Carlos Mérida" has its root in the Museo Nacional de Historia y Bellas Artes (national museum of history and fine arts), which was opened on November 10, 1934, and accredited by government on January 15, 1935. It was located in the Templo del Calvario, that was demolished in 1947. The idea reconstruction in a former Policía Nacional Civil building grew during the celebration of the 1953 national feast.
