= Escuela Nacional de Artes Plásticas "Rafael Rodríguez Padilla" =

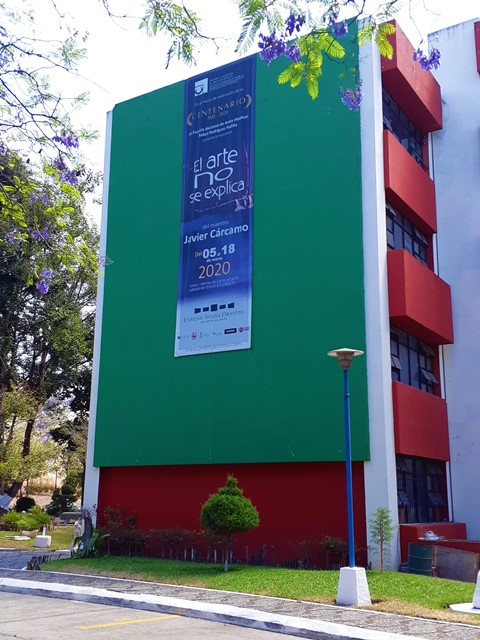
- Former names: Academia de Bellas Artes
- Motto: Patrimonio cultural de la nacion (Cultural heritage of the nation)
- Type: Fine arts: Drawing & painting Sculpture; Graphics
- Established: 1920
- Affiliations: Government of Guatemala; Ministry of Culture and Sports (es)
- Director: Otto Arana
- Location: Guatemala City, Guatemala
- Language: Spanish
- Website: http://mcd.gob.gt/tag/enap/
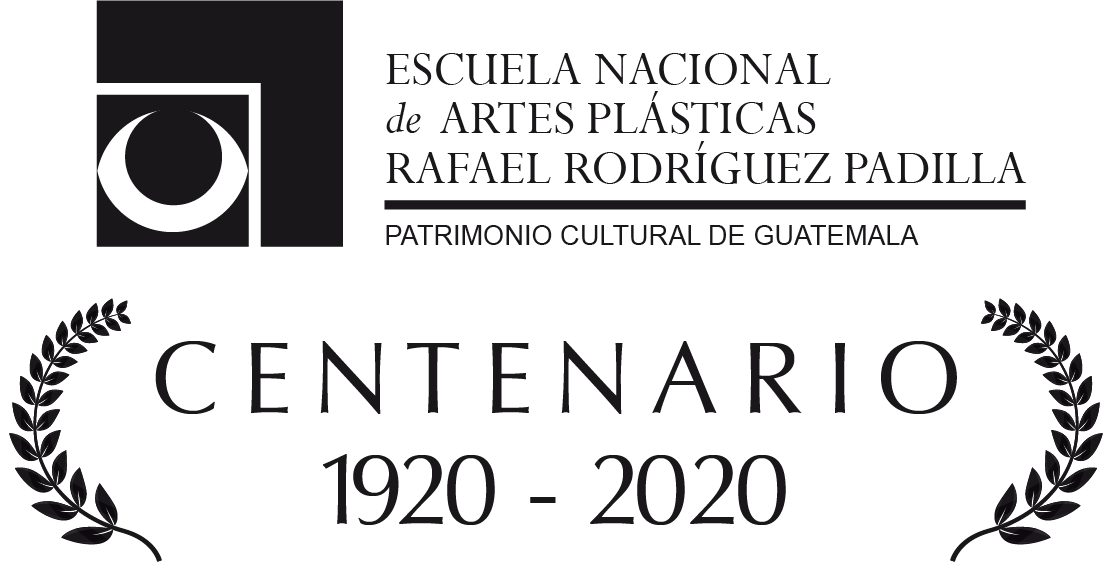

The Escuela Nacional de Artes Plásticas "Rafael Rodríguez Padilla" (National School of Plastic Arts) (ENAP), based in Guatemala City, is a public institution of higher education, research, and professional education in academic and applied fine arts of painting, sculpture, and graphic design.

== Brief history ==
Escuela Nacional de Artes Plásticas "Rafael Rodríguez Padilla" was founded in 1920 as Academia de Bellas Artes (Academy of Fine Arts) in 1920. Its current name bears the name of its founding director, Rafael Rodríguez Padilla (1890–1929).

== Course offerings ==
- Painting
- Sculpture
- Graphic art

== Notable faculty, staff, and alumni ==
Faculty and staff — current and former

- José Luis Álvarez (1917–2012), student in the 1930s, teacher from 1958 to 1986
- Rafael Rodríguez Padilla (1890–1929), co-founder and director from 1920 to 1928
- Rafael Yela Günther (1888–1942), director until 1942
- Javier Cárcamo Guzmán (born 1980), teacher
- Julio Dubois (1880–1960), student, later professor and director from 1942 to 1944 (Note: "Julio Dubois, imaginero," Prensa Libre, Guatemala City, June 17, 2001 (retrieved January 28, 2015))
- Víctor Vásquez Kestler (1927–1994), student and lecturer (Note: "Víctor Vásquez Kestler," wikiguate, La enciclopedia en linea de Guatemala (wikiguate.com.gt) Website hosted by the Institute of Linguistics, Rafael Landívar University, with support from (i) Programa de Apoyo a la Calidad Educativa (PACE) and (ii) the German Technical Cooperation Agency (GTZ) (de) (webserver; Grupo Multimedios) (retrieved January 28, 2015))

Alumni

- Ana María de Maldonado, student
- César Silva, student
- Dagoberto Vásquez, student
- Elmar René Rojas, student
- Erwin Guillermo (es), student
- Iván de León Rodríguez (es) (born 1955), student
- Jorge Mazariegos Rodríguez, student
- Manolo Gallardo (es) (born 1936), student
- Moisés Barrios, student
- Luis Rolando Ixquiac Xicara (born 1947), student
- Jorge Corleto (born 1960), teacher
