= Sandra Monterroso =

Guatemalan visual artist and designer

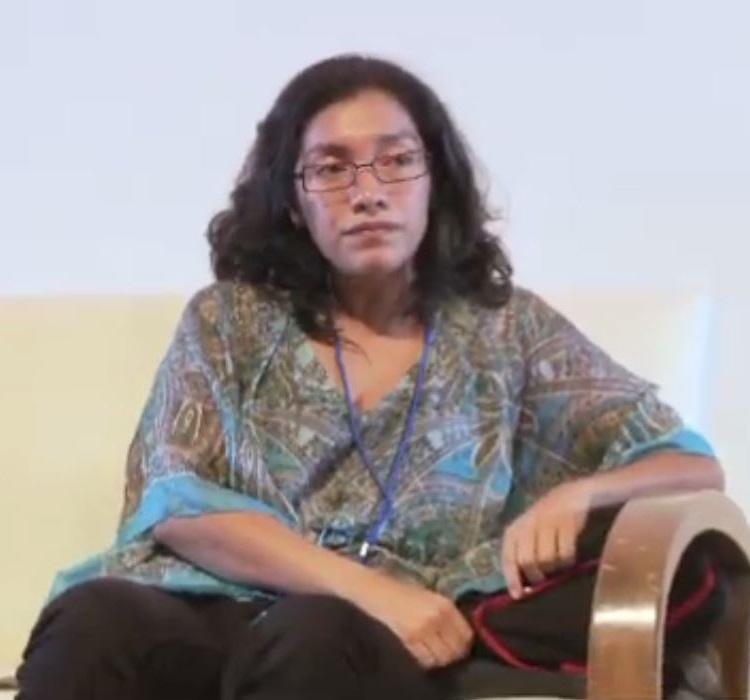
- Born: 1974 (age 51–52); Guatemala
- Education: BA,Rafael Landivar University; MA, Universidad Popular Autonoma del Estado de Puebla; PhD, Academy of Fine Arts Vienna
- Movement: Performance art, video art, textile art

Sandra Monterroso (born 1974) is a Guatemalan visual artist and designer. Art historian Virginia Pérez-Ratton writes about Monterroso's beginnings as a performance artist in Guatemala during 1999 and 2000. Alongside her were other Guatemalan female performers like Regina José Galindo and Jessica Lagunas. Recently Monterroso's work focuses not only in performance art. She works with different media such as video art, installations and mixed media. Her work is related to power structures, gender issues and decolonial thinking. Her work is also included in the Artist Pension Trust.

== Education ==
Monterroso studied Graphic Design at an undergraduate level at the Rafael Landívar University in Guatemala. She holds a Master's in Design Processes from Universidad Popular Autónoma del Estado de Puebla (UPAEP). She is currently pursuing a PhD in Practice from the Academy of Fine Arts Vienna.

== Career ==
=== Select video art ===
Year	Video	Location	Comments
2014	La devolución del Penacho de Vucub Caquix. The devolution of the Vucub Caquix	Guatemala	The artist is standing with closed eyes inside a clear acrylic parallelepiped, inside has many black feathers, she's caught under the impossible to get out, her body is stained black, while the transparent becomes opaque. In that opacity is the border of truths. The action is based on Moctezuma's Penacho found in Vienna, and it is unclear whether in fact the origin and why is it still belongs to this European city.

=== Select performances ===
Year	Performance	Location	Comments
2008	Rakoc Atin (Do Justice)	Supreme Court of Justice, Guatemala City	Using salt, the artist shapes the letters 'RAKOC ATIN' (Do justice in Maya Q'eqchi' language) in the floor in front of the Supreme Court. She then injects serum into the letters, slowly dissolving them. It speaks about cases that have gone unsolved in Guatemala due to language barriers.
1998	Phoenix Bird	Guatemala	The video is built on the myth, a woman's body goes ash covers the public space to spread feathers.

== Exhibitions (selection) ==
=== Solo exhibitions ===
In 2011, Ernesto Calvo curated Monterroso's solo exhibition, Efectos Cruzados, in Galería Piegatto in Guatemala City. The exhibit was later shown at El Museo de Arte San Salvador (MARTE) in 2013. In February 2014, the artist opened her solo show, Actions to Abolish the Desire at the 9.99 Gallery.

=== Group exhibitions ===
In May 2009, Rosina Cazali and Joanne Bernstein presented Performing Localities, a series of lectures and videos on post-war Guatemalan artists including Monterroso at InIVA. On June 17, 2009, Monterroso joined other female artists from Guatemala and Bolivia for an event called Feminist Art-Action: Panorama of feminist contemporary Latin-American video-performance, which was held at the Centre Georges Pompidou and organized by le peuple qui manque.

In January 2014, Ciudad de la Imaginación, a contemporary art space in the western highlands of Guatemala, invited Monterroso to participate in the Estados de Excepción exhibition that traveled to Arte Actual in Quito, Ecuador. In 2014, Monterroso participated as a part of the Indigenous Voices project in the Montevideo Biennial: 500 Future Years, curated by Alfons Hug. In 2015 Monterroso has been invited to participate in the Latin American Pavilion for the 56th Venice Biennale and in the 12th Havana Biennial.

== Awards and recognition ==
- 2014: RD Foundation Vienna
- 2012: Juannio, 2nd place
- 2011: Juannio, 3rd place
- 2006: XV Bienal de Arte Paiz, first place
- 2004: Inquieta Imagen - Museum of Contemporary Art and Design

== Bibliography ==
- Perez-Ratton, Virginia. "Central American Women Artist in a Global Age." Global Feminisms: New Directions in Contemporary Art. Ed. Maura Reilly and Linda Nochlin. 1st ed. Brooklyn: Merrell, 2007. 123-42. Print.
