= María Díaz =

María Díaz may refer to:

- Maria Adela Diaz, Guatemalan artist
- María Alejandra Díaz, Venezuelan politician
- María Angélica Díaz del Campo (born 1965), Mexican politician
- María de Jesús Díaz Marmolejo (born 1967), Mexican politician
- María Isabel Díaz Lago (born 1964), Cuban actress
- María Martha Díaz Velásquez (born 1951), Honduran politician
- María Rosa Díaz (born 1953), Argentine politician
- María Díaz Cirauqui, Spanish footballer
- María Díaz de León (born 1962), Mexican politician
- Marie-Isabelle Diaz (1898–2011), French supercentenarian
