= Regina José Galindo =

Guatemalan performance artist

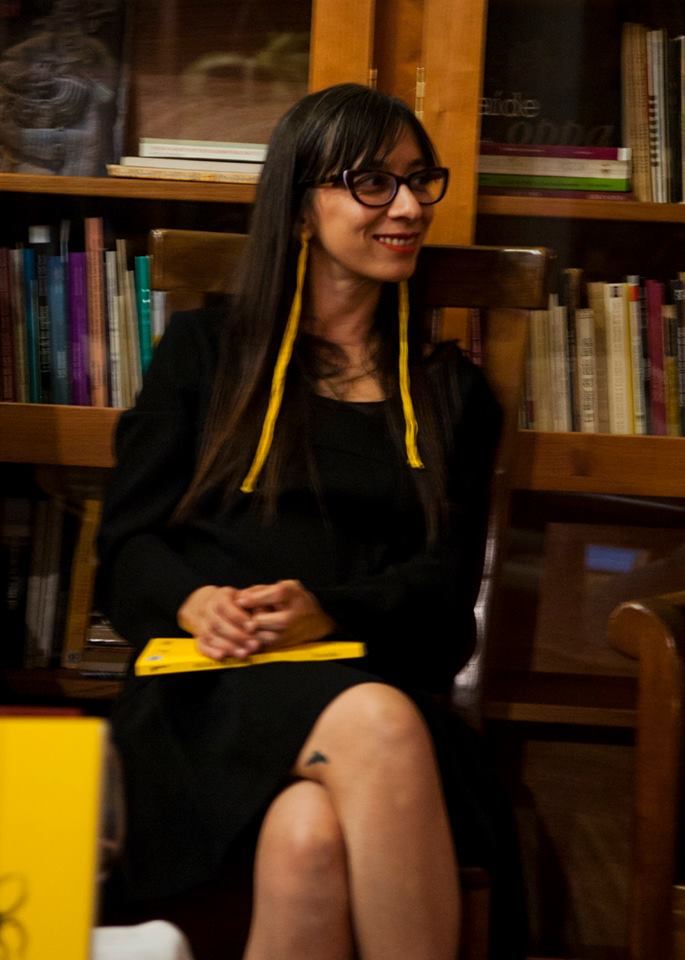
- Born: August 27, 1974 (age 52); Guatemala City, Guatemala
- Education: Secretarial school
- Known for: Performance art; political art; poetry
- Notable work: ¿Quién puede borrar las huellas?; Perra; Himenoplastia; 279 Golpes; Confesión
- Style: Performance art
- Awards: Golden Lion (Venice Biennale, 2005); Prince Claus Prize (2011)
- Website: www.reginajosegalindo.com

Regina José Galindo (born August 27, 1974) is a Guatemalan artist who specializes in performance art. She is currently one of the main artists working in this medium in Latin America, and is also a poet. Her work is characterized by her explicit political and critical content, using her body as a tool for confrontation and social transformation. She received the Golden Lion as best young artists in the Venice Biennale in 2005 and the Prince Clause Prize in 2011.

== Biography ==
Galindo was born in Guatemala City in 1974, where she lives and works. Her artistic career is framed by the Guatemalan civil war that occurred from 1960 and 1996. This conflict was marked by genocide with more than 200,000 victims, many of them indigenous, agricultural workers, women and girls, and also by a deeply ingrained social inequality resulting from colonialism pair with government instability.

" I have only lived in Guatemala with a great violence problem, specially a limitless gender violence. During the armed conflict, the damage to the female population was part of the war strategy to induce terror in the population, because when you kill a woman you also kill the chance for life. Currently, and since a few years ago, this is part of Guatemalan reality, but in higher numbers. Every day women are killed in brutal ways. Generally the bodies of men appear beheaded, or with a shot on the head, stabbed, or asphyxiated. But women's bodies show evidence of rape and torture before being killed Regina José Galindo, 2007.

== Early work ==
Remarkably, for an artist who is known for the political themes of her work, Galindo grew up in a lower middle class household where politics generally, and the Guatemalan civil war more specifically, were not discussed. She attended secretarial school but her career as a secretary was not a successful one. Her work as a poet developed through attending workshops and groups which met in friends' houses, at which time she wrote the pieces that became part of her book Personal and Intransmisible.

Galindo started her professional career working in advertisement, according to her this helped her make better connections between images and words.

Her first steps in the artistic world where linked to poetry and drawing, getting close to the contemporary art world with other artists, especially Jessica Lagunas and Maria Adela Díaz. Aníbal López (also known as A-1 53167) has been a good friend for Galindo, and is noted as an important influence on her work.

She specialized in the use of performance art starting with one of her first works "Lo voy a guitar al viento" (I will yell it to the wind) in 1999. Her own body becomes the protagonist of her work, when she hangs herself from a bridge in Guatemala while reciting her poetry to denounce the atrocities inflicted on women under the abuse of political power.

With her work, Galindo has spoken up against violence, machismo (toxic masculinity) and one of the main topics is femicide, occidental beauty canon, state violence, and abuse of power, specially in the context of her country, even though her language relates to other contexts.

In her earlier work she used her body exclusively, sometimes subjecting herself to extreme situations and her interaction with volunteers or hired people that take the action beyond her control. Such as the work Himenoplastia (2004) where she went under hymen reconstruction surgery.

== Performances ==
She first gave two performances in Guatemala in 1999, and gained international fame. One of her well-known acts include ¿Quién Puede Borrar las Huellas? (Translated: "Who Can Erase the Traces"), from 2003, in which she walked from the Congress of Guatemala building to the National Palace, dipping her bare feet at intervals in a white basin full of human blood as a vigorous protest against the presidential candidacy of Guatemala’s former dictator José Efraín Ríos Montt.

Another of her notable works was titled Perra (2005), in which she carved the Spanish word perra, or bitch, on her legs, in protest against violence against women.

"279 Golpes" (279 Blows) is another of her performances from 2005 in which she is enclosed in a cubicle and inflicts a blow on her own body for each murdered woman in Guatemala from January 1st to the 9th of that year.

She frequently collaborates with other art performers, including compatriot Aníbal López.

== List of solo exhibitions ==
Date(s)	Exhibition title	Location	Work(s) exhibited	Curator (if known)	Notes
February 9–June 16, 2019	La Sombra (The Shadow)	Picket Family Video Gallery, Herbert F. Johnson Museum of Art, Cornell University, Ithaca, New York, USA	La Sombra (The Shadow) (video)		
January 23–March 31, 2018	SOS	Prometeogallery di Ida Pisani, Milan, Italy	El Objectivo; La Sombra (The Shadow) (video); SOS		El Objectivo was conceived of for the Stadtmuseum in Kassel, Germany.
September 23, 2017 – January 23, 2018	El Objetivo (The Objective)	Proyectos Ultravioleta, Guatemala City, Guatemala	La Sombra (The Shadow) (video and 2 photographs); Presence (Presencia) (13 photographs); The Objective (El objetivo) (video and 5 photographs)		
November 18, 2015 – January 13, 2016	Mazorca	Prometeogallery di Ida Pisani, Milan, Italy			According to Clare Carolin, the show was the first major UK presentation of Galindo's work as well as the first monographic survey of her work.
September 10—October 25, 2015	Bearing Witness	Van Every / Smith Galleries at Davidson College, Davidson, North Carolina, USA			Exhibition included 23 works of art and had an accompanying catalog.
November 2013–April 2014	Retrospectiva	El Nuevo Museo, Guatemala City, Guatemala			
January 31–March 29, 2009	Regina José Galindo: The Body of Others	Modern Art Oxford, Oxford, United Kingdom			

== List of group exhibitions ==
In October 2008, Galindo exhibited alongside renowned artists like Tania Bruguera and Jimmie Durham at MoMA PS1 for NeoHooDoo: Art for a Forgotten Faith, an exhibition co-organized by The Menil Collection.

Between March 25 and June 8, 2014, Padiglione d'Arte Contemporanea (PAC) exhibited a selection of Galindo's work in Estoy Viva. The show was divided in five sections: Politics, Woman, Violence, Organic and Death. Works such as ¿Quién puede borrar las huellas? (Who can erase the traces?, 2003), Himenoplastia (2004), Mientras, ellos siguen libres (While they are still free, 2007) and Caparazon (Shell, 2010) were presented alongside newer works that had not been exhibited before in Italy.

In January 2020, Galindo was part of Artpace’s exhibit titled Visibilities: Intrepid Women of Artpace. Curated by Erin K. Murphy, Visibilities not only kicks off the nonprofit's 25th anniversary celebration, but also highlights past artists from their International Artist-in-Residency program, such as Galindo who was a resident in Spring 2008. In Visibilities, a video that Galindo created during the 2008 residency is being showcased at Artpace for the first time.

== Recognition ==
Galindo received the Golden Lion award at the Venice Biennale in 2005, in the category of “artists under 30”, for her video Himenoplastia. This work, nevertheless, got a particularly hostile reception during its first showing in Guatemala, in 2004. The controversial work depicted surgical reconstruction of the artist’s hymen.

In October 2009, Exit Art showed a solo exhibition of Galindo's work as part of their SOLO series and Performance in Crisis program.

A book on Galindo’s performance work has been published in Italy (Vanilla Edizioni, 2006). Galindo is also a writer of poetry and narrative; in 1998 she received the Myrna Mack Foundation's Premio Unico de Poesía in Guatemala for Personal e intransmisible (Scripta Coloquia, 2000).

In 2011 the jury of the 29th Biennial of Graphic Arts in Ljubljana (Dave Beech, Christian Höller, Urška Jurman, and Ulay /Frank Uwe Laysiepen/) awarded her with the Grand Prize for the works: Confesión (Confession), 2007 which was produced in Spain and inspired by the extraordinary rendition flights uncovered by a team of local reporters in Palma de Mallorca, and the Prince Claus Awards.

== List of works ==
Selected works
Year	Performance	Location	Comment
2014	“Exhalación (Estoy Viva)”	PAC Milan	For this performance Galindo lied naked at the ground floor of the pavilion. Under cold temperatures, one person at a time was invited to hold a mirror under her nose. The clouded mirror being the only sign of life, contradicting all of the signs of an apparent death.
2011	“Alarma”	Banco de España Metro Station, Madrid, Spain	A site–specific video installation by Regina José Galindo, commissioned by La Caja Blanca for the tunnels adjacent to the vaults which protect Spain’s national gold reserves.
2007	“Confesión”	Palma de Mallorca, Spain	Inspired by waterboarding. Based on recently declassified CIA documents. A videotape of this performance was presented as an installation during the Sydney Biennial of 2010. A videotape of this performance was presented as an installation at the Venice Biennial of 2009. ‘Performing Torture’, Essay by Professor Julian Stallabrass, preface to "Confesión", Regina José Galindo, to be published in 2011.
2006	“Corona”	Main Square, Guatemala City	public installation, commemorating over 6040 killings during the year Peace Agreements were signed, ending the 36-year-long war.
2005	“Perra”	Prometeo Galery, Milan, Italy	Self-flagellation with a knife, carving the word "perra" into her skin, protesting violence to women in Guatemala during 2005.
2005	"(279) Blows"		In this performance piece, the artist hits herself 279 times while in a box, commemorating the 279 Guatemalan women who died at the hands of sexist violence within the first half of 2005.
2004	“El Peso de la Sangre”	Main Square, Guatemala City	Galindo sat under a structure in Guatemala City's main square as a liter of blood was emptied, drop by drop, over Galindo's head and clothes.
2003	“¿Quién puede borrar las huellas?”	Guatemala City	Galindo walked through the streets carrying a bowl of human blood, repeatedly stepping in the bowl to create bloody footprints, commemorating the victims of the genocide during the Civil War.
2001	“Angelina”	Guatemala	For the duration of this work, Galindo spent one month dressed as a maid.
2000	“Sobremesa”	Guatemala City	performance/installation
1999	“El cielo llora tanto que debería ser mujer”	Guatemala City	In her first performance work, a stark naked Galindo continuously submerged herself in a tub of water for as long as she can hold her breath. It was performed in a higher middle class shopping mall.
1999	“Lo voy a gritar al viento”	Post Office Building, Guatemala City	For 30 minutes, Galindo hanged herself in the arch of the main post office building in Guatemala City, and read her poems aloud without the use of a microphone. The texts talked about gender issues. The day after, the performance was featured on the front page of the main newspapers in the country.

== Bibliography ==
- Cazali, Rosina, and Fernando Castro Florez. Regina José Galindo. Milan: Silvana Editoriale, 2011. Print.
- Díaz, Tamara, and Virginia Pérez-Ratton. "Regina Galindo: Toque De Queda (2005), Perra (2005), Un Espejo Para La Pequeña Muerte (2006)." Estrecho Dudoso. Costa Rica: TEOR/éTica, 2006. 60-61. Print.
- Sileo, Diego, and Eugenio Viola. Regina José Galindo: Estoy Viva. Milan: Skira, 2014. Print.
- Siviero, Viviana, and Marco Scotini. Regina José Galindo. Albissola Marina: Vanillaedizioni, 2006. Print.
- Villena Fiengo, Sergio, Regina José Galindo. El performance como acto de resistencia. Revista Centroamericana de Ciencias Sociales, Vol. VII, nº 1, 2010, https://www.academia.edu/3465907/Regina_Galindo._El_performance_como_acto_de_resistencia
- Villena Fiengo, Sergio, "Intervenciones intempestivas en Centro América. El anti-ceremonial público en la obra de Regina Galindo", Revista de Estudios Globales & Arte Contemporáneo, Vol. 3, nº 1, 2015, https://www.academia.edu/26755279/EL_ANTI-CEREMONIAL_PÚBLICO_EN_LA_OBRA_DE_REGINA_JOSÉ_GALINDO_2016_
