= List of unproven methods against COVID-19 =

Many fake or unproven medical products and methods claim to diagnose, prevent, or cure COVID-19. Fake medicines sold for COVID-19 may not contain the ingredients they claim to contain, and may even contain harmful ingredients. In March 2020, the World Health Organization (WHO) released a statement recommending against taking any medicines in an attempt to treat or cure COVID-19, although research on potential treatment was underway, including the Solidarity trial spearheaded by WHO. The WHO requested member countries to immediately notify them if any fake medicines or other falsified products were discovered. There are also many claims that existing products help against COVID-19, which are spread through rumors online rather than conventional advertising.

Anxiety about COVID-19 makes people more willing to "try anything" that might give them a sense of control of the situation, making them easy targets for scams. Many false claims about measures against COVID-19 have circulated widely on social media, but some have been circulated by text, on YouTube, and even in some mainstream media. Officials advised that before forwarding information, people should think carefully and look it up. Misinformation messages may use scare tactics or other high-pressure rhetoric, claim to have all the facts while others do not, and jump to unusual conclusions. The public was advised to check the information source's source, looking at official websites; some messages have falsely claimed to be from official bodies like UNICEF and government agencies. Arthur Caplan, head of medical ethics at New York University's medical school, had simpler advice for COVID-19 products: "Anything online, ignore it".

Products that claim to prevent COVID-19 risk give dangerous false confidence and increase infection rates. Going out to buy such products may encourage people to break stay-at-home orders, reducing social distancing. Some of the pretend treatments are also poisonous; hundreds of people have died from using fake COVID-19 treatments.

== Diagnosis ==
Medically approved tests detect the virus or the antibodies the body makes to fight it off. Government health departments and healthcare providers provide tests to the public. There have been fraudsters offering fake tests; some have offered tests in exchange for money, but others have said the test is free to collect information that could later be used for identity theft or medical insurance fraud. Some fraudsters have claimed to be local government health authorities. People have been advised to contact their doctor or genuine local government health authorities for information about getting tested. Fake tests have been offered on social media platforms, by e-mail, and by phone.

- Counterfeit testing kits, which were originally used for testing HIV and monitoring glucose levels, were touted as for coronavirus diagnosis.
- Holding one's breath for 10 seconds was claimed to be an effective self-test for the coronavirus. The WHO stated that this test did not work and should not be used.
- Manufacturer Bodysphere briefly sold what it claimed were coronavirus antibody tests. It falsely marketed them as having received FDA Emergency Use Authorization. It also falsely claimed they were made in the United States.

== Prevention and cure claims ==
Widely circulated rumours have made many unfounded claims about methods of preventing and curing infection with SARS-CoV-2. Among others:

=== Disinfection-related methods ===
==== Hand cleaning methods ====
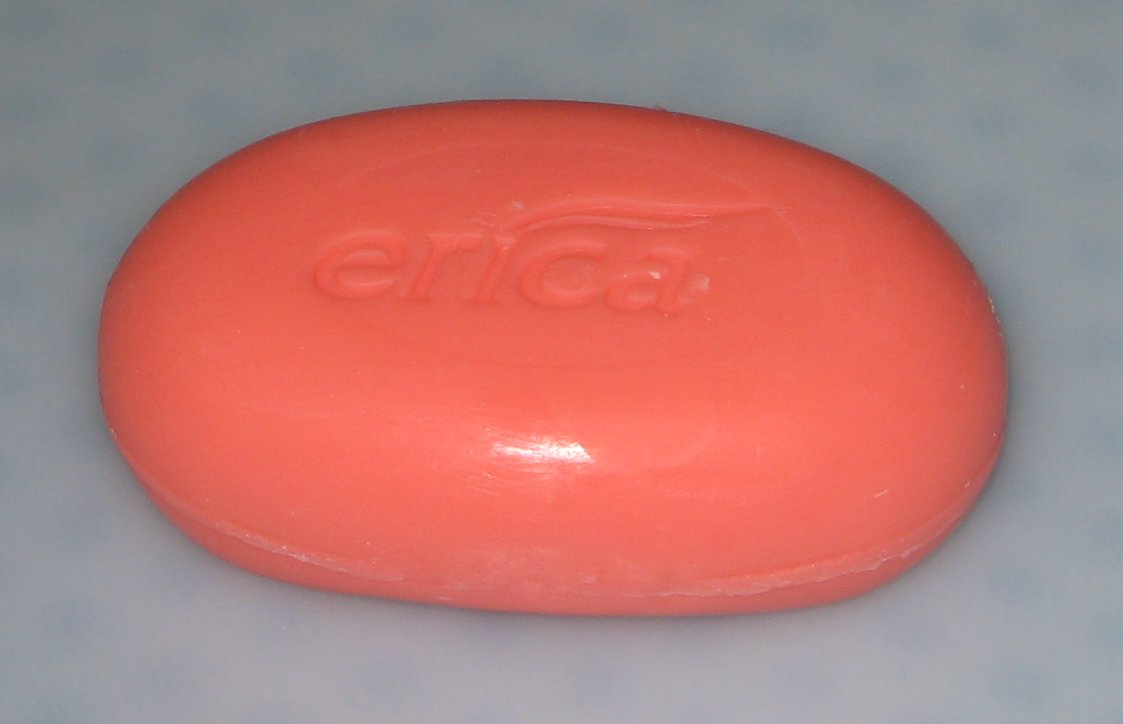
Washing hands with plain soap and water (for ≥20 seconds) is effective at removing SARS-CoV-2. Hand sanitizer is a slightly inferior option for sanitizing hands. Neither antibacterial soap nor red soap are any more effective than plain soap.

- Hand sanitizer is not more effective than washing in plain soap and water. Washing in soap and water for at least 20 seconds is recommended by the US Centers for Disease Control and Prevention as the best way to clean hands in most situations. However, if soap and water are unavailable, a hand sanitizer containing at least 60% alcohol can be used, unless hands are visibly dirty or greasy.
- Soap removes coronaviruses effectively, but antibacterial soap is not better than plain soap.
- Red soap is not more germicidal than soaps of other colors, contrary to claims in a popular Facebook post, said Ashan Pathirana, the registrar of Sri Lanka's Health Promotion Bureau (HPB); he suggested that it might be a reference to carbolic soap.
- Hand sanitizer prepared at home by mixing rum, bleach, and fabric softener has been widely promoted as effective at preventing COVID-19 in YouTube videos in the Philippines. The Integrated Chemists of the Philippines (ICP) released statements saying that alcoholic drinks contain only about 40% alcohol, less than the 70% needed in effective hand sanitizers, and that mixing bleach and alcohol creates chloroform. The manufacturers of the brands of rum and bleach used in the videos have publicly issued statements calling the recipe dangerous and urging people not to use it.
- Vodka was alleged to be an effective homemade hand sanitizer, or an ingredient in one. The company whose brand was alleged to be protective responded to the rumours by citing the US Centers for Disease Control and Prevention statement that hand sanitizers needed to be at least 60% alcohol to be effective, and stating that their product was only 40% alcohol.
- Claims that vinegar was more effective than hand sanitizer against the coronavirus were made in a video that was shared in Brazil. That was disproved, as "there is no evidence that acetic acid is effective against the virus" and, even if there was, "its concentration in common household vinegar is low".

==== Gargling, nasal rinses, and inhalation ====
- Inhaling bleach or other disinfectants is dangerous and will not protect against COVID-19. They can cause irritation and damage to tissues, including the eyes. They are poisonous and WHO has warned not to take them internally and to keep them out of the reach of children. They are safe and effective when used to disinfect surfaces such as countertops, but are not safe for human consumption.
- Controversial alternative medicine proponents Joseph Mercola and Thomas Levy claimed that inhaling 0.5–3% hydrogen peroxide solution using a nebulizer could prevent or cure COVID-19. They cite research using hydrogen peroxide to sterilize surfaces, incorrectly asserts that it can therefore be used to clean human airways. A tweet from Mercola advertising this method was removed from Twitter on April 15, 2020, for violating the platform rules. Inhalation of hydrogen peroxide can cause upper airway irritation, hoarseness, inflammation of the nose, and burning sensations in the chest. At high concentrations, inhaling hydrogen peroxide can cause permanent neurological damage or death. Though hydrogen peroxide use as an alternative and complementary form of medicine is advocated for use in multiple disease processes, including COPD, asthma, pneumonia and bronchitis, there seems to be no trials regarding its use. It was reported a case of possible side effect related to chronic (during 5 years) and subacute hydrogen peroxide inhalation use which lead to interstitial lung disease in the form of acute pneumonitis.
- Gargling with saltwater was said to kill the coronavirus in claims on Weibo, Twitter, and Facebook. These claims were falsely attributed to respiratory expert Zhong Nanshan, Wuhan Union Hospital, and several other people and institutions, sometimes with the attribution changed and the actual advice copied verbatim. Zhong Nanshan's medical team published a refutation, pointing out that the virus settles in the respiratory tract, which cannot be cleaned by rinsing the mouth. The WHO also said it had no convincing evidence that this method would provide any protection against COVID-19.
- Saltwater sprays were given at the door of the River of Grace Community Church in South Korea in the false belief that this would protect people from the virus; the same unsterilized spray bottle was used on everyone, and may have increased the risk. Subsequently, 46 devotees were infected with the virus.
- "Corona-Cure Coronavirus Infection Prevention Nasal Spray" was fraudulently marketed online.
- There is no evidence that saline nasal rinses help prevent COVID-19.

==== Temperature ====
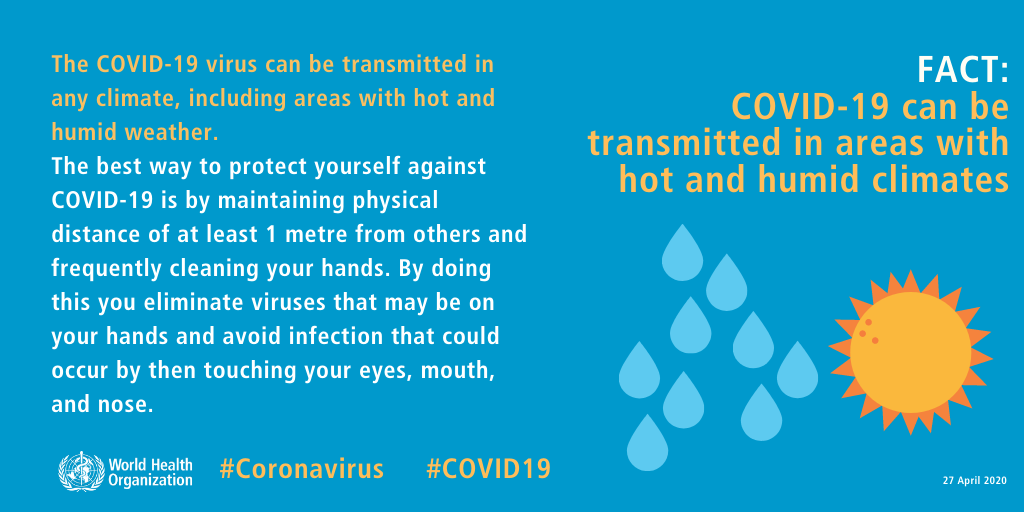
A World Health Organization infographic dispelling the myth that hot and humid weather prevents the spread of the virus.

- Cold weather and snow do not kill the COVID-19 virus. The virus lives in humans, not in the outdoors, though it can survive on surfaces. Even in cold weather, the body will stay at 36.5–37 degrees Celsius inside, and the COVID-19 virus will not be killed.
- Hot and humid conditions do not prevent COVID-19 from spreading, either. There have been many COVID-19 cases in countries with hot and humid climates.
- Drinking warm water or hot baths/heating to 26–27 °C (79–81 °F) will not cure people of COVID-19. It has been claimed that these statements were made by UNICEF in coronavirus prevention guidelines, but UNICEF officials refuted this.
- High temperatures cannot be used on humans to kill the COVID-19 virus. Taking very hot baths can cause burns, but the body will stay at 36.5–37 degrees Celsius inside, and the COVID-19 virus will not be killed.
- Hot saunas and hand or hair dryers do not prevent or treat COVID-19.
- Steam inhalation was suggested on Facebook as a cure for coronavirus infection. Inhaling steam will not treat or cure COVID-19.

==== Radiation ====
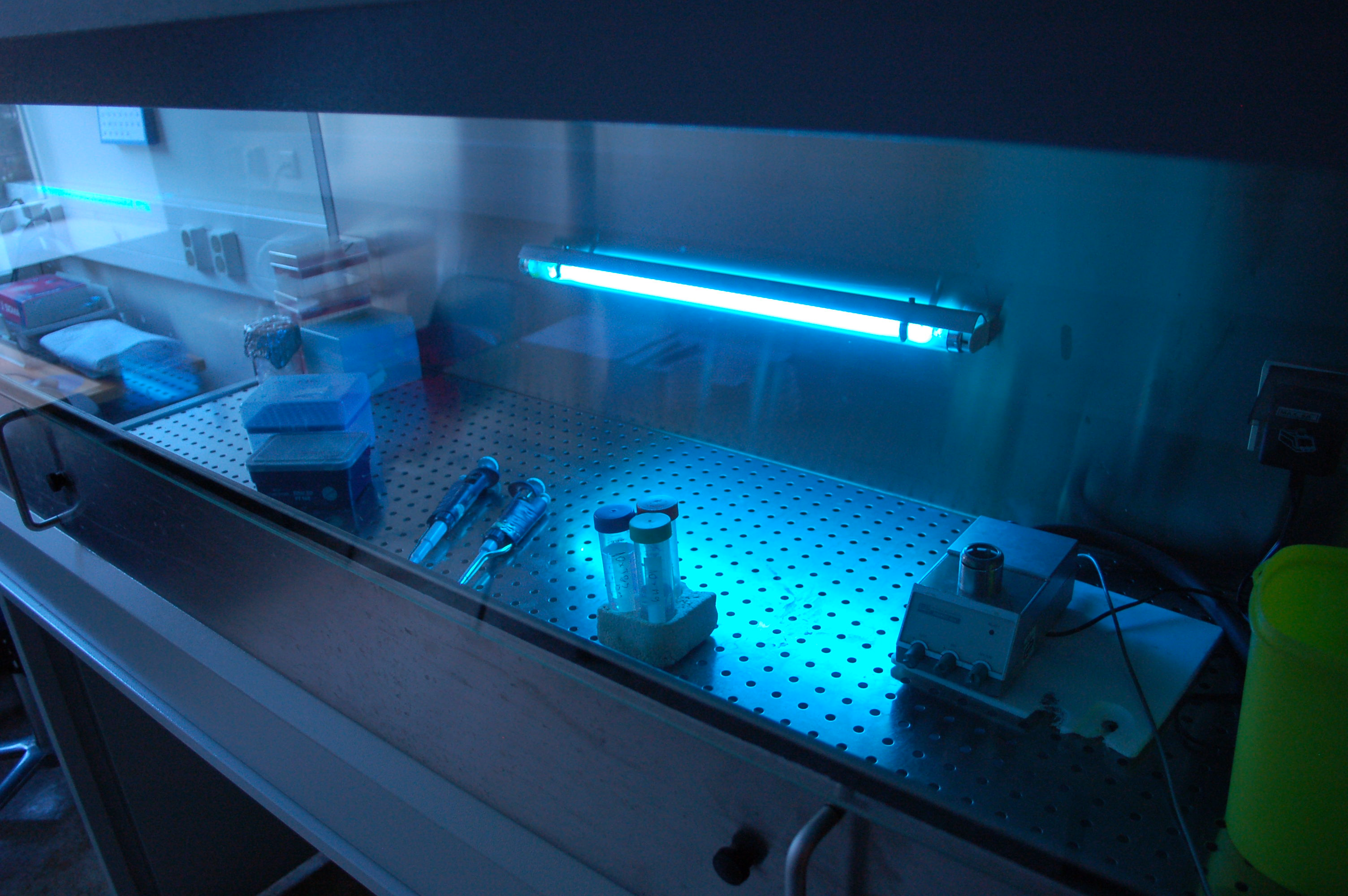
UV-C light being used to sterilize equipment in a laboratory. UV-C cannot be used to disinfect people as it can damage the skin and eyes.

- Exposing people to sunlight will not prevent or cure COVID-19. It has been falsely claimed that UNICEF said so, in coronavirus prevention guidelines; UNICEF officials refuted this. The virus can spread in even the sunniest of weather.
- UV-C light cannot be used on humans to kill the COVID-19 virus. Attempting to use UV to sterilize people can cause skin irritation and damage the eyes.

==== Other disinfection-related methods ====
- White color does not have a 'harmful effect' on coronavirus, as claimed in a widely shared Facebook post; nor does the colour of a handkerchief have an effect on the virus, according to Ashan Pathirana, the registrar of Sri Lanka's Health Promotion Bureau (HPB). Using handkerchiefs or tissues of other colours to sneeze or cough into will be just as effective.
- Posts on social media claimed that volcanic ash from the eruption of the Taal Volcano on January 12, 2020, in the Philippines was the cause of low infection rates in the country, falsely stating that it could kill the virus and had "anti-viral" and "disinfectant qualities".
- Drinking bleach is extremely dangerous and will not protect against COVID-19. Bleach is poisonous and damages internal organs. Drinking it can cause disability and death. The WHO has warned not to drink the substance.

=== Protective equipment ===
- USB flash drives were being sold for $370 as a "5G Bioshield", purportedly offering protection from the non-existent threat of infection transmitted via 5G mobile telephone radio waves.
- Over 34,000 counterfeit surgical masks—which may have been touted as providing coronavirus prevention—were seized by Europol in March 2020.
- Making masks out of wet-wipes has not been officially recommended as an alternative to surgical masks, contrary to some claims. Some public health authorities have issued directions for making and using homemade cloth face masks. See face masks during the COVID-19 pandemic.
- Aerosol Boxes—acrylic boxes placed over patients' heads during aerosol generating procedures, such as intubation—can potentially increase dispersal of COVID-containing aerosol particles if a patient coughs.

=== Drugs of abuse ===
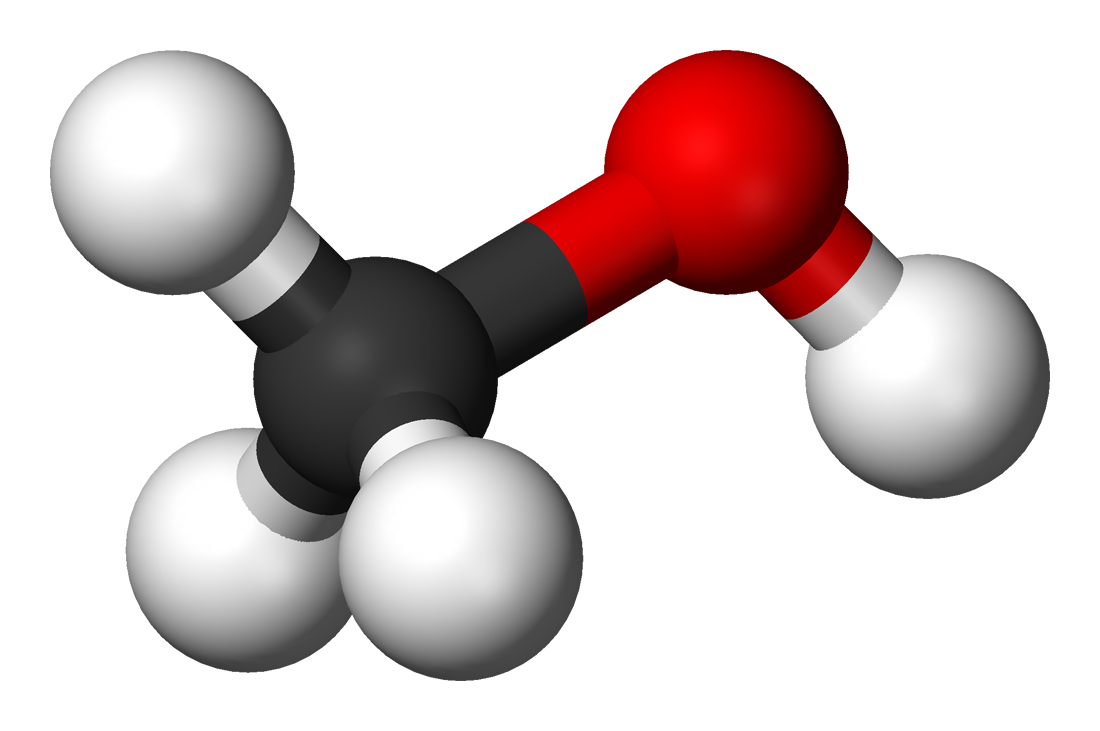
Methanol has one carbon atom (dark grey). It is immediately poisonous; a single dose can cause blindness, brain and spinal cord damage, and death. Blackmarket alcoholic drinks may contain methanol.

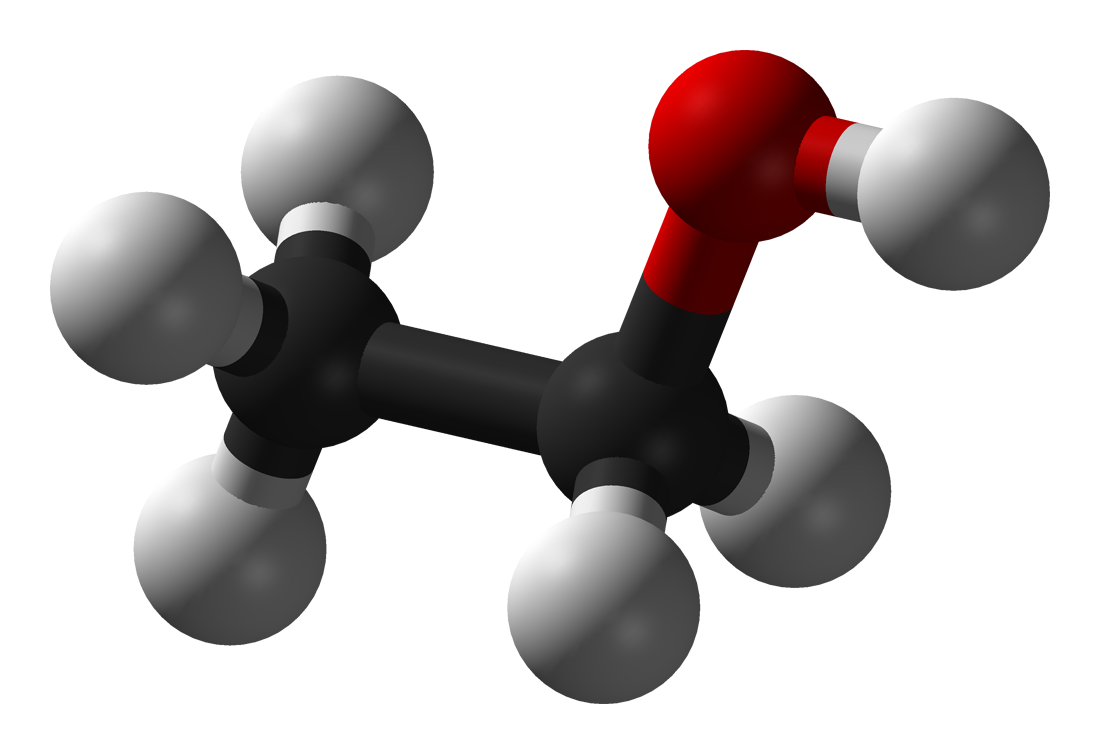
Ethanol has two carbon atoms (dark grey). Ethanol should not be confused with methanol. Ethanol-containing drinks are widely consumed as the main ingredient in alcoholic beverages. Ingestion doesn't prevent COVID-19, and may cause subclinical immunosuppression.

- A mix containing amphetamines, cocaine, and nicotine, on sale on the dark web for US$300, was fraudulently presented as a vaccine against COVID-19.
- Cocaine does not protect against COVID-19. Several viral tweets purporting that snorting cocaine would sterilize one's nostrils of the coronavirus spread around Europe and Africa. In response, the French Ministry of Health released a public service announcement debunking this claim, saying "No, cocaine does NOT protect against COVID-19. It is an addictive drug that causes serious side effects and is harmful to people’s health." The World Health Organization also debunked the claim. Facebook flagged the rumour as misinformation.
- A claim that cannabis could protect against the coronavirus appeared on YouTube, along with a petition to legalize cannabis in Sri Lanka. Sri Lankan Health authorities pointed out that there was no evidence that cannabis protected against COVID-19. A fake webpage purporting to be a Fox News article also claimed that CBD oil was a potential cure.
- The chloroform- and ether-based drug loló was said to cure the disease in messages spread in Brazil.
- Boiled betel leaves will not cure COVID-19.
- Industrial methanol was claimed to cure the coronavirus. Drinking alcohol is ethanol, while methanol is acutely poisonous. The WHO has warned not to drink ethanol or methanol in an effort to kill the virus. Iranian media were reporting nearly 300 dead and 1000 hospitalized (or 600 dead and 3,000 hospitalized, according to an unidentified doctor in the Health Ministry) as of April 8, 2020. Alcoholic beverages are illegal in Iran, resulting in a black market in liquor made illegally.
- Contrary to some reports, drinking ethyl alcohol also does not protect against COVID-19, and can increase health risks (short term and long term).

=== Commercial products ===
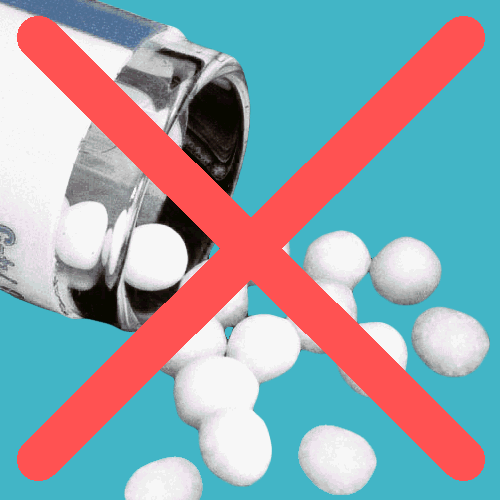
Homeopathic globuli (sugar pills) do not make people immune to COVID-19.

Many fraudulent and unproven products are claimed to treat or protect against COVID-19.

- "Virus Shut Out Protection" pendants, supposedly from Japan, worn around one's neck, have been sold with claims that they prevent infection. The U.S. Environmental Protection Agency said that no evidence had been presented that they work, and took legal action against importers.
- A Twitter post claimed that scientists from the "Australian Medical University" had developed a vaccine for the coronavirus. It accepted 0.1 Bitcoin as payment for a "vaccination kit" and promised shipping in 5–10 days. The linked website was later removed.
- Homeopathic 'Influenza complex' has been marketed as a preventive measure for COVID-19 by a man in New Zealand, who claimed to have identified and imbued his product with the "frequency" of COVID-19 using a "radionics machine". Homeopathic remedies like this have no active ingredients and cannot protect against flu, colds, or COVID-19, said University of Auckland associate professor and microbiologist Dr Siouxsie Wiles. The NZ Ministry of Health said that COVID-19 was not a strain of flu, and criticized products that claim to prevent COVID-19 as giving dangerous false confidence.
- Homeopathic treatment with Arsenicum album is claimed as an "add on" to prevent COVID-19.
- A person living in California marketed pills for curing coronavirus, although the contents of the pill were not made public. He was arrested for attempted fraud, which carries up to 20 years in prison.

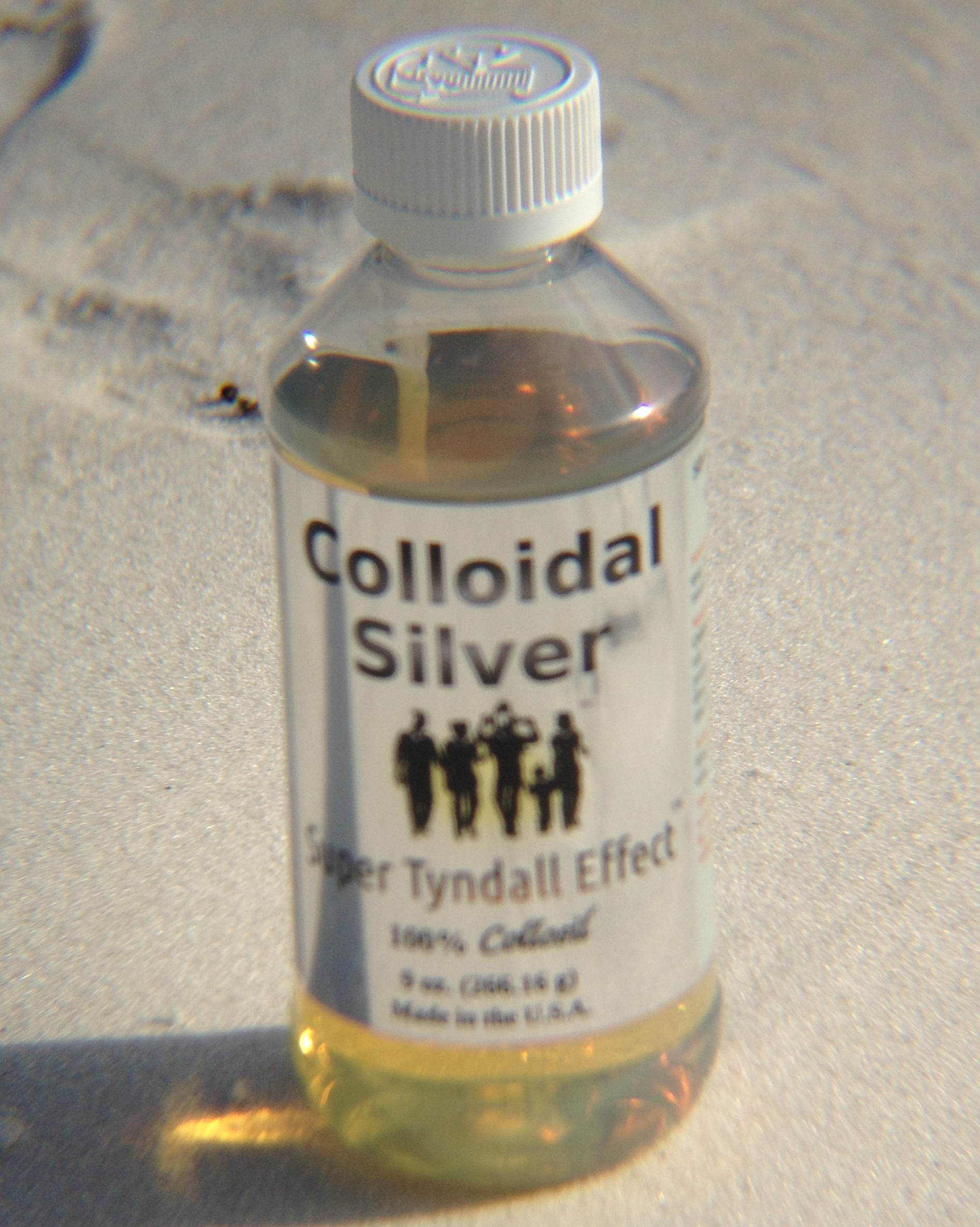
Colloidal silver is falsely marketed as a cure for COVID-19 infection.

- Claims that colloidal silver solution can kill over 650 pathogens, including coronavirus, prompted antifraud actions. The National Center for Complementary and Integrative Health warned on their website against taking colloidal silver as a dietary supplement. Seven warning letters were filed against companies for selling fraudulent products. Preacher Jim Bakker had been claiming that the colloid silver he sold (and only his) could be used to treat COVID-19. Colloidal silver is not an effective treatment for anything, and may interfere with other medications or cause permanent argyria (blue-gray skin discoloration).
- Toothpastes, dietary supplements and creams were being sold illegally in the US, with claims that they could cure coronavirus infection. Alex Jones was directed by the USFDA to cease promoting these products as a cure.
- Celebrity chef Pete Evans claimed that the BioCharger NG Subtle Energy Platform device, costing US$14,990, could cure the coronavirus. He faced backlash, taking down his advertisement after the Australian Medical Association dismissed the product as a "fancy light machine". The Australian distributors, Hydrogen Technologies Pty Ltd, stated the device would help "open the airways of Coronavirus victims by reducing the inflammation it causes in the lungs" as well as other unproven therapeutic claims. Evans was fined AU$25,200 by the Therapeutic Goods Administration for his false claims and the company was fined AU$50,400 for false advertising.
- "Miracle Mineral Solution" (MMS) is a mixture of sodium chlorite (with table salt and some other trace minerals) and an acid, which reacts with the sodium chlorite to produces a solution of unstable chlorous acid, which becomes chlorite, chlorate, and chlorine dioxide, an industrial bleach. The FDA has warned against using it, saying there is no evidence that it cures, prevents, or treats COVID-19, and that it is seriously hazardous to health. The "Genesis II Church" calls its mail-order MMS a "sacrament", and when warned by the FDA that their claims that it could cure COVID-19 were fraudulent, vehemently refused to stop making them, saying the FDA had no authority over them, and they would never stop. Their status as a religious organization was disputed in a successful filing for a temporary restraining order on grounds of public safety by the U.S. Attorney's Office in South Florida.
- Shuanghuanglian, a mixture of plants invented in the 1960s as part of official state-sponsored TCM (traditional Chinese medicine), was advertised by the Xinhua News Agency as being able to treat the coronavirus. Posts on Weibo claimed that many people violated social distancing rules while queuing to buy it. Some attributed the news stories to stock market manipulation.
- Jennings Ryan Staley, a licensed physician and owner of Skinny Beach Med Spa, was accused of selling mail-order "COVID-19 treatment packs", claiming they would protect against COVID-19 for six weeks and cure it "100%", causing the disease to disappear in hours. He has been arrested and is being "vigorously investigated" by the FBI; if convicted, he may face 20 years in prison.
- A hand cream sold by the right-wing populist party leader of the party Greek Solution, Kyriakos Velopoulos, via his TV shop, is claimed to completely kill COVID-19, although it is not approved by medical authorities.
- Mohanan Vaidyar, a self-proclaimed naturopath, was arrested in Kerala for claiming that he can cure COVID-19 and treating people.
- Methylene chloride, commonly used as a paint stripper, was being marketed on eBay as a coronavirus disinfectant. It had been previously banned by the U.S. Environmental Protection Agency due to the risk of asphyxiation during use.
- Chlorine dioxide tablets and sanitizers were marketed on Amazon.
- A purportedly anti-virus lanyard called Shut Out resulted in the criminal conviction of a Georgia woman for violating the U.S. Insecticide, Fungicide, and Rodenticide Act.
- Australian company Lorna Jane claimed that its "anti-virus activewear" prevents and protects against infectious diseases, including COVID-19, before being fined by the Therapeutic Goods Administration $40,000 for false advertising.

=== Traditional Chinese Medicine ===
China officially promotes the use of Traditional Chinese Medicine (TCM) to treat COVID-19. Many academic papers, such as Shi et al., have been published trying to establish the effectiveness of various decoctions such as Qingfei Paidu Decoction. Most of the western media hold a skeptical attitude about its effectiveness, despite many positive accounts. There is much ongoing research trying to identify the effective ingredients for treating COVID-19 from inspirations from the TCM methods.

=== Traditional Persian Medicine ===
Various studies have been conducted and reported on the effect of traditional Persian medicine formulas on SARS-CoV-2. These treatments have been studied in various clinical trials in Iran.

=== Botanical claims ===
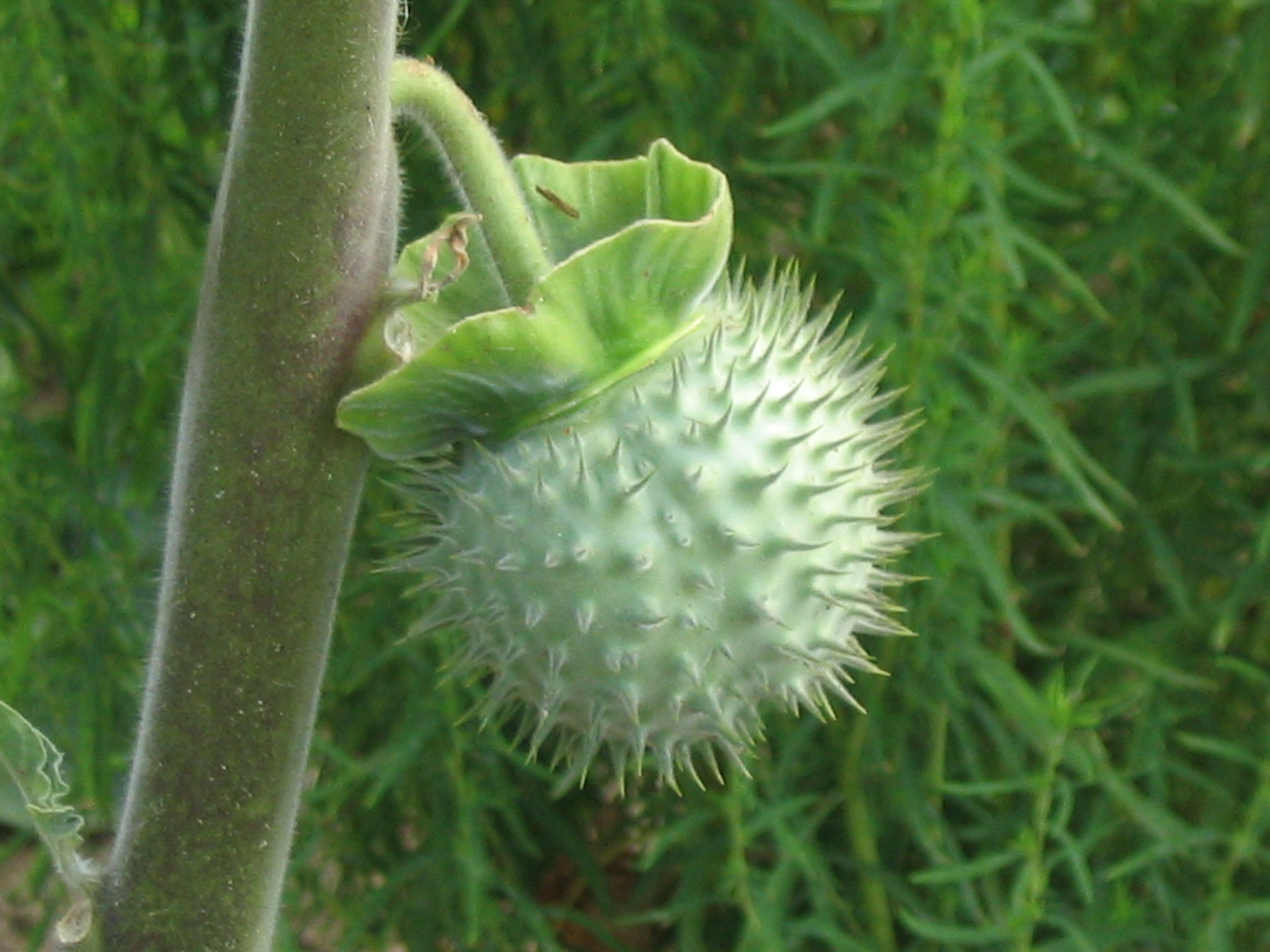
The poisonous fruit of the datura plant was claimed by some to be effective against coronavirus because it physically resembles the virus's virion.

- The poisonous fruit of the datura plant was falsely promoted as a preventive measure for COVID-19, which resulted in eleven people being hospitalized in India. They ate the fruit, following the instructions from a TikTok video that propagated the misinformation. The fruit was claimed to be effective on the grounds that it resembles the coronavirus virion.
- A complex Sri Lankan herbal drink was said to remedy all virus infections which can affect humans, including COVID-19, with reposts circulating widely on Facebook. The drink might reduce fever symptoms, but this might lead to the infected person infecting other people, and the mixture could have long-term health complications, according to L. P. A. Karunathilake, a senior lecturer at the Colombo University Institute of Indigenous Medicine.
- Andrographis paniculata was claimed to boost the immune system and relieve symptoms of coronavirus by a Thai media website. Pakakrong Kwankao, Head of the Empirical Evidence Centre at Chao Phraya Abhaibhubehjr Hospital, and Richard Brown, Programme Manager of Health Emergencies and Antimicrobial Resistance at the World Health Organization (WHO) in Thailand, said that there was no evidence to back these claims.
- Sap from Tinospora crispa (makabuhay) plants was claimed to serve as an antibiotic against the coronavirus when used as an eye drop; it was also claimed that the coronavirus is on the skin and crawls to the eyes. These rumours circulated in the Philippines. Jaime Purificacion from the University of the Philippines’ Institute of Herbal Medicine said that while there was evidence for makabuhay as a treatment for scabies, there was no evidence that it was useful for treating coronavirus, and no evidence that putting the sap in your eyes was safe. He strongly advised against putting plant sap in the eyes, saying it could be dangerous. The WHO has stated that antibiotics do not kill the coronavirus, as they kill bacteria, not viruses.
- A recipe consisting of ingredients often purported to prevent and cure colds, including lemon grass, elder, ginger, black pepper, lemon and honey, was promoted by María Alejandra Díaz, a member of the Venezuelan Constituent Assembly as a cure for COVID-19. Díaz also described the virus as a bioterrorism weapon.
- The President of Madagascar, Andry Rajoelina launched and promoted Covid-Organics in April 2020: a herbal drink based on an artemisia plant as a cure that can treat and prevent COVID-19.
- United States President Donald Trump and Mike Lindell participated in a July meeting at the White House regarding the use of oleandrin as a treatment for coronavirus. Lindell soon acquired a financial stake in Phoenix Biotechnology Inc, a company trying to find a profitable use for oleandrin. Oleandrin is toxic and potentially lethal to humans.

=== Religious and magical methods ===
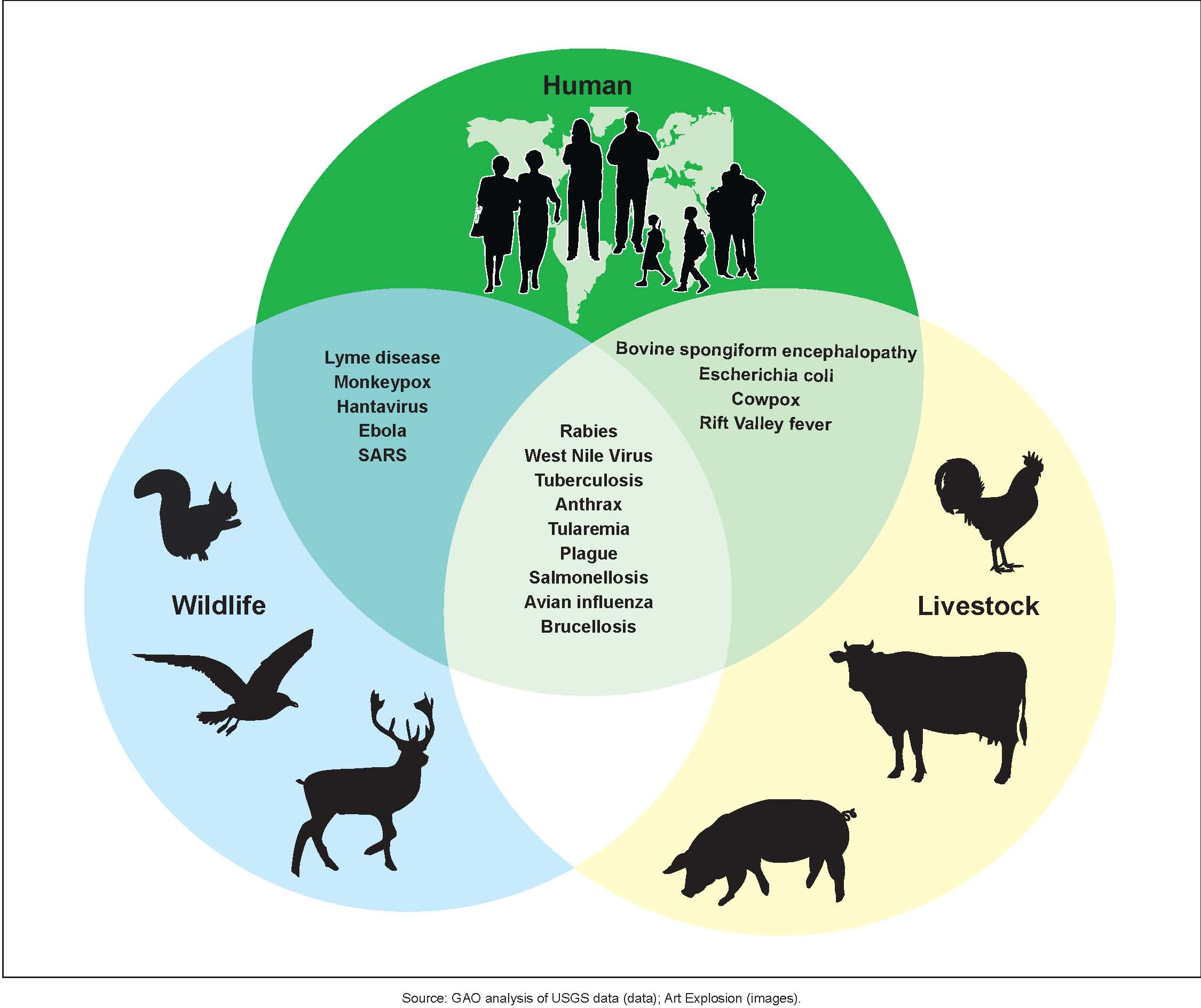
Zoonosis involves a disease hopping between humans and other animals

Performing wudu, a washing before prayer, from individual sinks rather than a common pool.

- During the pandemic, the alternative anthroposophic medicine promoted at Steiner hospitals in Germany became notorious amongst legitimate medics for forcing quack remedies on sedated hospital patients, some of whom were critically ill. Remedies used included ginger poultices and homeopathic pellets claimed to contain the dust of shooting stars. Stefan Kluge, director of intensive care medicine at Hamburg's University Medical Centre said the claims of anthroposophic doctors during the pandemic were "highly unprofessional" and that they "risk[ed] causing uncertainty among patients".
- Indian politician Swami Chakrapani claimed that drinking cow urine and applying cow dung on the body could cure COVID-19. He also stated that only Indian cows must be used. MP Suman Haripriya also promoted cow dung and urine . In March 2020, the All India Hindu Union hosted a "cow urine drinking party" in New Delhi, attended by 200 people. There exists no scientific evidence in favour of cow urine. Dr. Shailendra Saxena of the Indian Virological Society stated that there is no evidence that cow urine has any anti-viral effect, and eating cow dung might transmit diseases to humans zoonotically. For example, giardiasis, E. coli, salmonellosis and tuberculosis can all be transmitted via bovine fecal matter.
- Drinking camel urine has been advocated in the Middle East. The WHO stated that camel urine should not be drunk, in order to avoid contracting Middle East Respiratory Syndrome–related coronavirus (MERS-CoV), a more deadly, SARS-CoV-2-like species of betacoronavirus.
- Televangelist Kenneth Copeland urged followers to touch their televisions as a means of vaccination by proxy, and also attempted to exorcise COVID-19 on at least three occasions by summoning "the wind of God", stating that this had destroyed the virus (either in the US or worldwide). Earlier, he had urged followers to ignore public health advisories and come to his churches, saying they could be healed there by the laying on of hands if they fell ill.
- "Happy Science", a secretive pay-to-progress religious group, sells "spiritual vaccines" to prevent and cure COVID-19, advertises virus-related blessings at rates from US$100 to over US$400, and sells coronavirus-themed DVDs and CDs of Ryuho Okawa (the former stockbroker whom the group believes to be the current incarnation of the supreme deity) lecturing, which are claimed to boost immunity, as of April 2020. After initially defying social-distancing measures, it closed its New York temple and administered spiritual vaccines remotely.
- A suggestion that COVID-19 could be prevented by applying a cotton ball soaked in violet oil to the anus has brought Abbas Tabrizian renewed widespread ridicule in Iran. The IRNA news agency reported that Abbas Tabrizian, who has often promoted his remedies as Prophetic medicine in opposition to standard medicine, has also claimed that COVID-19 is God's revenge against those who had bothered him. An arrest warrant has been issued for Morteza Kohansal, a follower of Abbas Tabrizian, who visited the coronavirus section of a hospital in Iran without wearing protective gear, and applied what he described as the "Prophet's perfume" to affected patients. Using Prophetic medicine has caused some Iranian clerics to delay getting standard medical treatment. Ayatollah Hashem Bathaie Golpayegani announced that he had cured himself of COVID-19 three weeks before being hospitalized. He died two days later.
- Some religious hardliners in Iran have advocated that people visit shrines to be healed, and opposed government closures of pilgrimage sites.
- Parliamentarian Ramesh Bidhuri of the Bharatiya Janata Party claimed that experts say using Namaste as a greeting prevents transmission of COVID-19, but using Arabic greetings such as Adab and As-salamu alaykum does not prevent it as they direct air into the mouth.
- Religious and scientific misconceptions related to the coronavirus are widespread in Pakistan. According to a survey research conducted by Ipsos, 82% of people in Pakistan believed that performing wudu/ablution five times a day will keep them protected from contracting COVID-19. Meanwhile, 67% polled believed that jamaat (congregation prayer) cannot become a source of infection and 48% people believed that shaking hands cannot infect anyone since it is Sunnah.

=== Food and drink ===
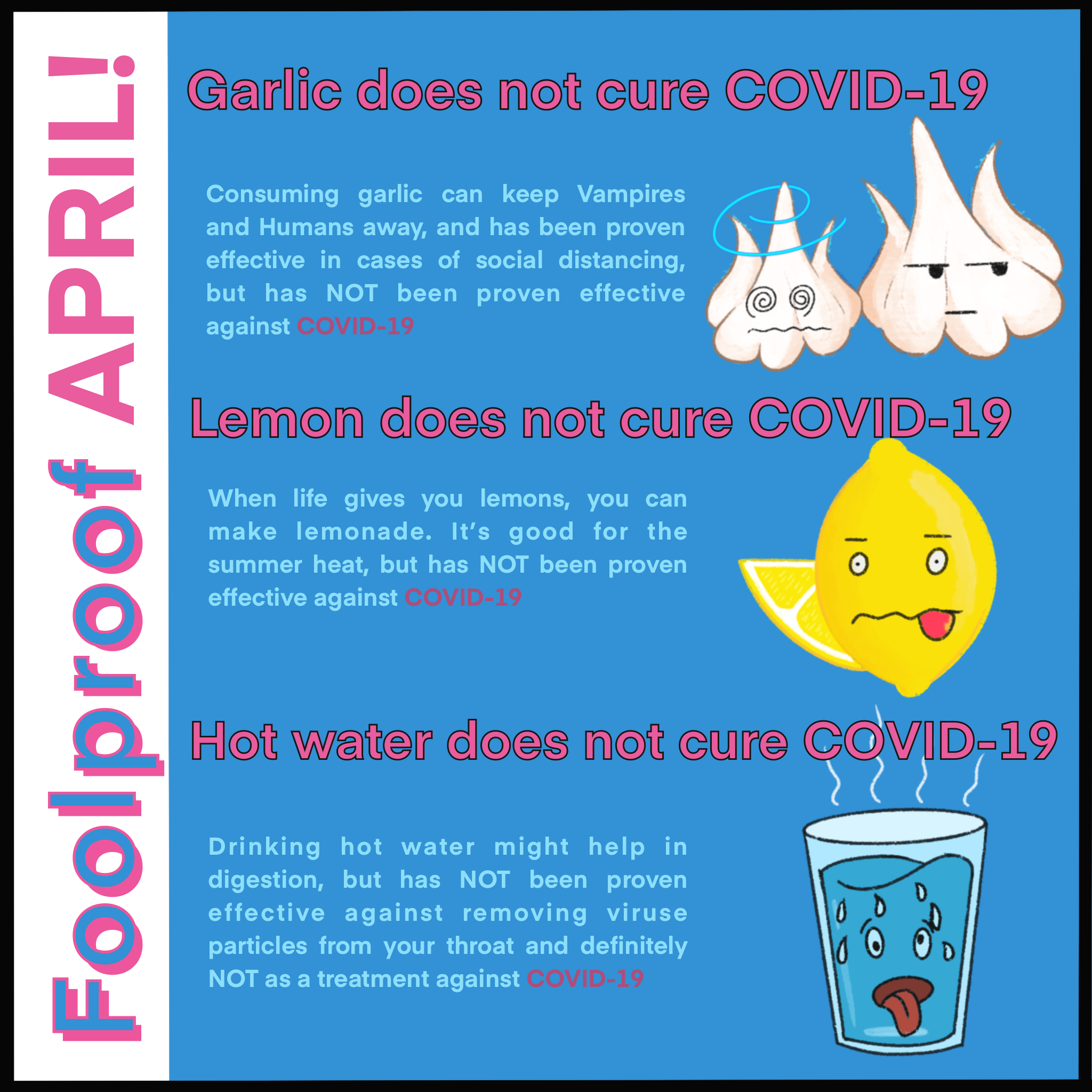
A poster for spreading awareness of unproven food claims

==== Fruit ====
- Drinking lemon in warm water has been claimed to prevent both COVID-19 and cancer by increasing vitamin C levels. This claim circulated on Facebook in English, French, Spanish, and Portuguese. There is no evidence that vitamin C was effective against coronaviruses, nor are lemons the fruit with the most vitamin C content, said Henry Chenal, director of the Integrated Bioclinical Research Centre (CIRBA) in Abidjan, Ivory Coast. The WHO said that there was no evidence that lemons would protect against COVID-19, though they recommended consuming fresh fruit and vegetables in a healthy diet.
- Bananas were claimed to be able to strengthen the immune system and prevent and cure COVID-19. The claim was based on a composited video that falsely attributed the statements to researchers at the University of Queensland. The university stated that the video was faked and urged people not to share it.
- Eating mango or durian will not cure COVID-19.
- Onions were rumoured to be a preventive measure against COVID-19 on Facebook.

==== Herbs and spices ====
- Garlic was said to prevent COVID-19 on Facebook. There is no evidence that garlic protects against COVID-19.
- Hot peppers cannot prevent or cure COVID-19.
- Consuming large amounts of boiled ginger after fasting for a day was rumoured to prevent or cure coronavirus on Facebook. There is no evidence that this prevents or cures any coronavirus infection, Mark Kristoffer Pasayan, a fellow at the Philippine Society for Microbiology and Infectious Diseases, said.
- Juice of bittergourd, a vegetable used in traditional medicine, was suggested as a cure for COVID-19 on social media.
- Consuming turmeric has been claimed to help prevent COVID-19, but the WHO says there is no evidence that it does.
- Neem leaves (Azadirachta indica) were claimed to be remedies for COVID-19 in rumours that circulated in India.
- Various retailers have marketed herbal products and essential oils fraudulently claimed to cure or prevent COVID-19.

==== Drinks and frozen foods ====
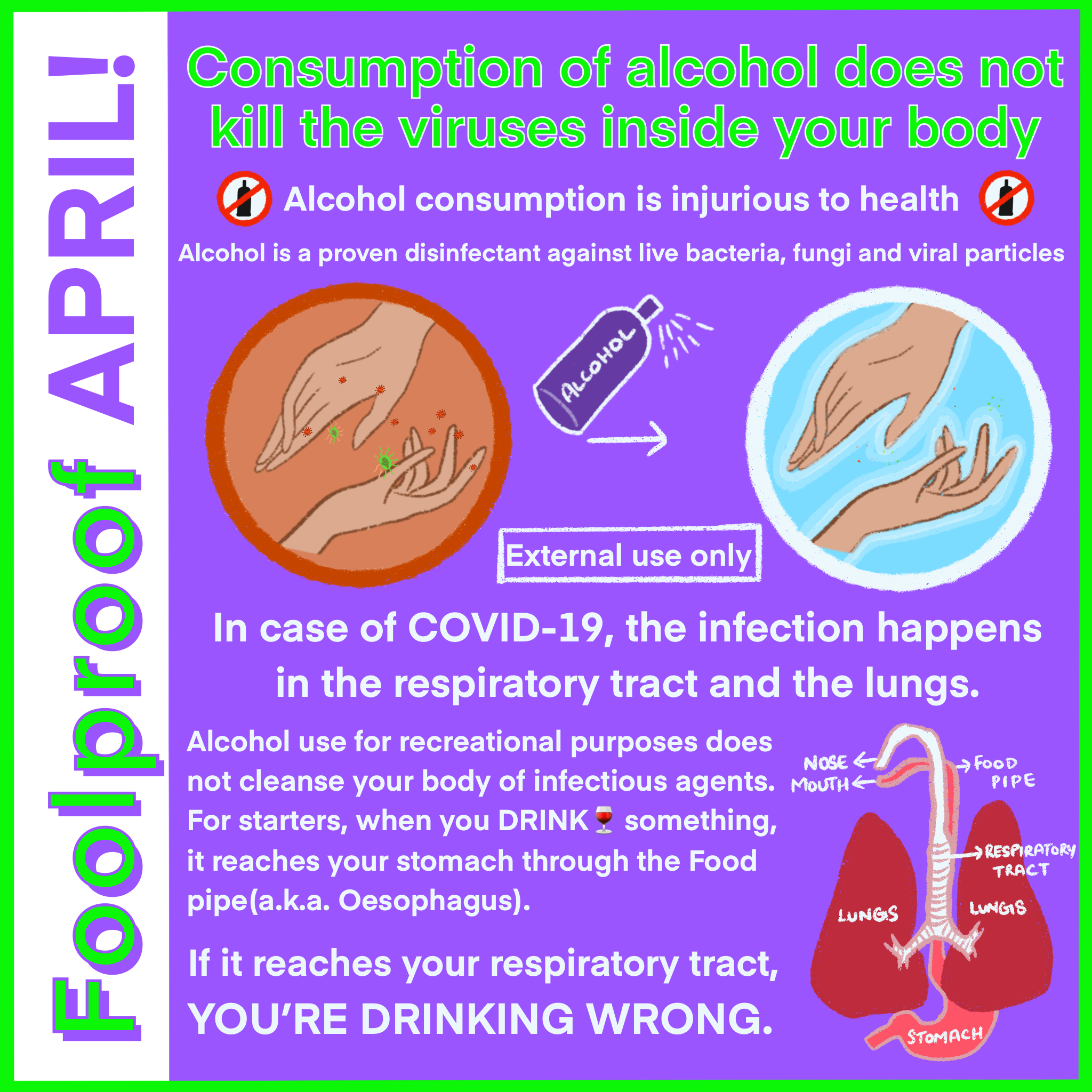
A poster explains that alcohol hand-sanitizers kill coronaviruses, but alcoholic drinks do not protect against COVID-19

- Drinking alcohol will not prevent or cure COVID-19, contrary to some claims. Drinking alcohol may cause subclinical immunosuppression (see "Addictive drugs" section above).
- Drinking water every 15 minutes was claimed to prevent coronavirus infection. Drinking large amounts of water will not prevent or cure COVID-19, though avoiding dehydration is healthy.
- Tea was said to be effective against COVID-19 in claims circulating on social media, which said that since tea contained the stimulants methylxanthine, theobromine and theophylline, it was capable of warding off the virus. These claims were falsely attributed to Dr Li Wenliang.
- Fennel tea (supposedly similar to the medicine Tamiflu—itself ineffective against coronaviruses—according to a false e-mail attributed to a hospital director) was claimed to be a cure in Brazil.
- So-called cures in messages spreading in Brazil included avocado and mint tea, hot whiskey and honey, essential oils, and vitamins C and D.
- Facebook claims that 'gargling salt water, drinking hot liquids like tea and avoiding ice cream can stop the transmission of COVID-19' have been criticized by health professionals.
- Eating ice cream and frozen foods will neither cure nor cause COVID-19, as long as they are hygienically prepared. This claim was widely attributed to UNICEF, which stated that they had made no such claim: "To the creators of such falsehoods, we offer a simple message: STOP. Sharing inaccurate information and attempting to imbue it with authority by misappropriating the names of those in a position of trust is dangerous and wrong".

==== Meat ====
- Claims that vegetarians are immune to coronavirus spread online in India, causing "#NoMeat_NoCoronaVirus" to trend on Twitter. Eating meat does not have an effect on COVID-19 spread, except for people near where animals are slaughtered (see zoonosis), said Anand Krishnan, professor at the Centre for Community Medicine of the All India Institute of Medical Sciences (AIIMS).
- Eating chicken will not cause COVID-19, as long as it is hygienically prepared and well-cooked.

==== Dishes ====
- There is no evidence that eating curry or rasam protects against COVID-19.

=== Exercises ===
- Taking six deep breaths and then coughing while covering one's mouth was circulated as a treatment for COVID-19 infection in social media, including by celebrities such as J. K. Rowling.

=== Use of existing medications unproven against COVID-19 ===
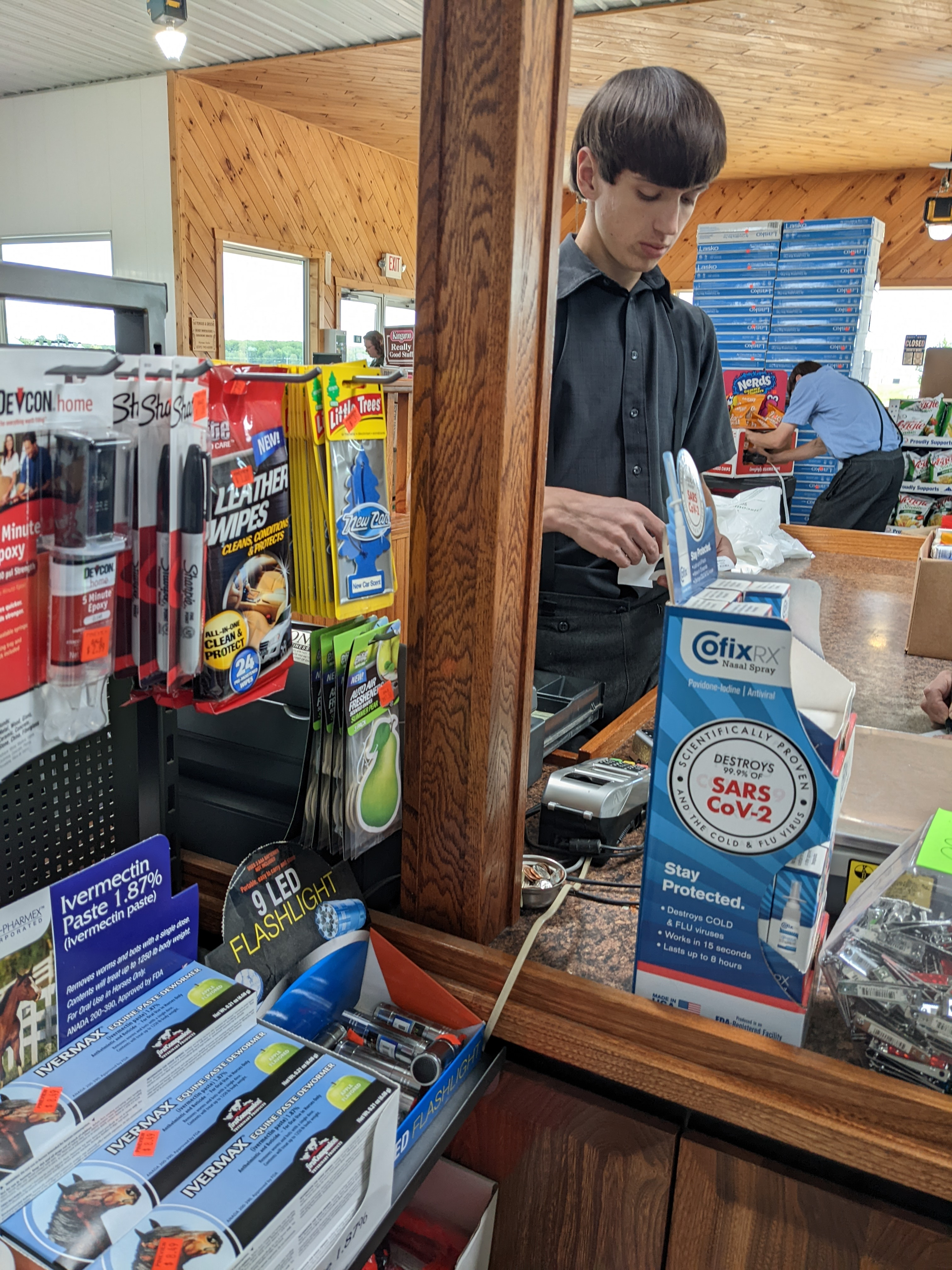
Veterinary ivermectin, sold alongside an unproven povidone-iodine nasal spray as COVID-19 treatments, at an Amish-run grocery store near McBain, Michigan.

- In March 2020, then US President Donald Trump promoted the use of chloroquine and hydroxychloroquine, two related anti-malarial drugs, for treating COVID-19. The FDA later clarified that it has not approved any therapeutics or drugs to treat COVID-19, but that studies were underway to see if chloroquine could be effective in treatment of COVID-19. Following Trump's false claim, panic buying of chloroquine was reported from many countries in Africa, Latin America and South Asia. Health officials across the world are issuing warnings over the use of antimalarial drugs after Trump's comments about treating the coronavirus with them sparked panic-buying and overdoses. Ugandan Dr. Chris Kaganda said, "There is no known dosage for Covid-19, and whether it can actually cure it, it's safer to avoid chloroquine, but you know these are desperate times." Patients with lupus and rheumatoid arthritis, who take these medications regularly, have had trouble obtaining supplies. Taking these, or related products intended for aquarium use, has caused serious side effects, illness, and death.
- Rumours circulated in Iraq that the Iraqi pharmaceutical company PiONEER Co. had discovered a coronavirus treatment. These reports were loosely based on a statement by PiONEER, which mentioned hydroxychloroquine sulphate and azithromycin (brand nameand "Zitroneer"), a common antibiotic) and said that it would try to make these drugs available free of charge. The statement did not say that these drugs can cure COVID-19. The company later clarified that they had not attempted to find a cure for COVID-19, and criticized the news media for spreading inaccurate reports and misinformation, running with the story without checking whether they had misunderstood the company's statement. Two days later, another false story was widely reported, saying that Samaraa, another Iraqi pharmaceutical company, had found a cure. Generally, antibiotics (like azithromycin) are not effective against viruses, only some bacteria. Azithromycin is sometimes given to patients hospitalized with COVID-19, but only to treat bacterial co-infection. Overuse of azithromycin causes antibiotic resistance, and rare side effects include heart arrhythmias and hearing loss.
- There were also claims that a 30-year-old Indian textbook lists aspirin, anti-histamines, and nasal spray as treatments for COVID-19. The textbook describes coronaviruses in general, as a family of viruses.
- There were also claims in April 2020 that an anti-viral injection had been approved as a cure in the Philippines, and the lockdown would be lifted. The persons making these claims were issued with a cease-and-desist order by the Philippine FDA, which reiterated the need to test treatments to be sure they are safe. The FDA said that they had not even received an application to register the treatment with the FDA. The agency has prohibited the use of the untested drug, and the clinic illegally promoting it subsequently closed.
- Ivermectin, a medication used to treat parasitic infections, was suggested as a possible COVID-19 treatment in an online preprint which utilized a flawed statistical methodology. Importantly, the concentration of the drug that was required to achieve the antiviral effects observed in cell culture was several times higher than what can be achieved in the bloodstream of patients. Clinical research subsequently determined ivermectin is not effective for treating COVID-19. Several right-wing politicians recommended ivermectin for use against COVID-19. For example, in an December 2021 interview, Herbert Kickl of the Freedom Party of Austria (FPÖ) presented the drug as an alternative to COVID-19 vaccintation, although internantional health authorities, such as the FDA, EMA and WHO, had previously stated that ivermectin should only be used for COVID-19 in clinical trials. The promotion of ivermectin as a COVID-19 treatment has led to increases in ivermectin-related poison control centre calls in the United States, as well as national shortages of the drug in Australia.

== Anti-fraud efforts ==
- Operation Pangea, launched by the international police organization Interpol, seized counterfeit facemasks, substandard hand sanitizers, and unauthorized antiviral medication in over 90 countries, resulting in the arrest of 121 people.
