= Fabunan Antiviral Injection =

Alternative medicine treatment

Alternative medicine
- Modality: Injection
- Claims: Treatment against dengue, chikungunya, dog bite, snakebite, HIV/AIDS, and COVID-19
- Original proponents: Ruben and Willie Fabunan

The Fabunan Antiviral Injection (FAI) is a patented medicine administered to patients by US-based Filipino doctors Ruben and Willie Fabunan, who claims that it can treat dengue fever, chikungunya, dog bite, snakebite, and HIV/AIDS.

== Formulation ==
Fabunan contains procaine hydrochloride, a water-soluble ester anesthetic, and dexamethasone sodium phosphate, a corticosteroid with well-known anti-inflammatory and immunosuppressant properties. The solution is intended to be administered as an intramuscular injection.

== Validity of claims ==
The patent application cites six case studies for conditions such as dengue, dengue hemorrhagic fever, and AIDS, which were all conducted at the Fabunan Medical Clinic in Burgos. To date, no registered clinical trials of the Fabunan Antiviral Injection have been performed to validate the Fabunans' claims.

=== COVID-19 claims ===
Recent claims promoted on social media that it can cure COVID-19 are not supported by the Philippine government, which has issued a cease and desist order to Fabunan Medical Clinic in Zambales, prompting the clinic to stop its operations on April 2. On April 15, 2020, the fact-checking website Rappler warned against false claims on YouTube and Facebook that the so-called treatment had been approved, and pointed out that on April 8, 2020, the FDA warned the public against the use of drugs or vaccines that are not yet certified to treat COVID-19, particularly the Fabunan Antiviral Injection. Similarly, claims popularly spread in YouTube videos in June 2020 that Fabunan has been approved in Indonesia have been demonstrated to be false.

== See also ==
- List of unproven methods against COVID-19
