= Jessica Lagunas =

Artist

- Born: 1971 (age 54–55); Nicaragua
- Education: Universidad Rafael Landívar (1992), Hunter College, City University of New York (2008), Art Students League, New York (2006–2011)
- Spouse: Roni Mocán
- Website: artist's website

Jessica Lagunas (born 1971) is an artist and graphic designer whose work focuses on "the condition of woman in contemporary society, questioning her obsessions with body image, beauty, sexuality and aging." Lagunas was born in Nicaragua in 1971, but grew up in Guatemala, where she studied graphic design at the Universidad Rafael Landívar. In 2001, she moved to New York City with her husband, artist Roni Mocán, where they live and work.

Lagunas works in a variety of formats and media, with particular interest in video performances and installation. Some of her pieces also make use of alternative media, such as hair. Lagunas' work has been exhibited at a number of international biennials, including the Pontevedra Biennial (Spain, 2010), El Museo del Barrio's Biennial (New York, 2007), Tirana Biennial (Albania, 2005), Cuenca Biennial (Ecuador, 2001), Caribbean Biennial (Dominican Republic, 2001) and the Paiz Biennial (Guatemala, 2012, 2010, 2008). She has also been featured in group exhibitions at the Art Museum of the Americas (Washington, D.C., 2012), Bronx Museum of the Arts (New York, 2006), Jersey City Museum (New Jersey, 2010, 2007), and the International Festival of Contemporary Arts–City of Women (Slovenia, 2010).

== Work ==
Lagunas' work is concerned with the societal obsession with women's body image and physical appearance. In her video works, Lagunas applies makeup or performs beauty rituals repeatedly in an exaggerated manner. In Para Verte Mejor (2005), for instance, she applies mascara to her eyelashes for the duration of the 57-minute video. In another, similar piece, she applies bright red lipstick in an hour-long video titled “Para besarte mejor” or “The Better to Kiss You With” inspired by the well-known tale of Little Red Riding Hood. For the series "Forever Young" (ongoing), Lagunas weaves strands of human hair – provided by visitors and staff at the Museo del Barrio in New York, as well as by the artist herself – using a technique traditionally used by Mayan women in Guatemala.

Lagunas is also interested in book arts, and was the 2012 Artist in Residence at the Center for Book Arts, NY. For Historias Íntimas (2009–11), the artist collected letters from female family members in which they recount the first time they experienced menstruation. Correlating to her respect for the female body and menstruation, the work "Días especiales (Special Days)" done in New York in 2008, circles are adorned with patterns inspired by vaginal tissue as seen under a microscope and placed on varying surfaces (such as beds, sheets, etc.) Between 2012 and 2015, Lagunas worked on a book project titled Feminicidio en Guatemala (Femicide in Guatemala), in which she embroidered femicide statistics from 2000–2010 in Guatemala.

Violence against women, as well as the violence experienced in Guatemala during the 36-year armed conflict, are of interest to Lagunas. Apart from Femicidio in Guatemala, the artist has created a number of pieces honoring and denouncing the prevalence of violence against women in the country, including In Memoriam (2007), and Para que nos recuerdes mejor. With 120 minutos de silencio (2008), a performance for which Lagunas cut shapes from a 40,00-yard piece of camouflage fabric, as well as with Deshilando el miedo (2010–12), Lagunas condemns the violent acts committed by the Guatemalan state during the civil war.
