= Maria Adela Diaz =

Guatemalan artist

Maria Adela Diaz is a Guatemalan contemporary artist. She was born in 1973, during the Guatemalan Civil War. She mentions that, as a Guatemalan citizen, she feels that political issues are a part of her identity and that a lot of her and her family's experiences are reflected through her artwork. Diaz is a self taught artist as well as a graphic designer, and has worked in the press, publicity, and media. While she does not consider herself a feminist, many of her works have been displayed in feminist exhibitions; she considers her work feminine because it is work done by a woman.

== Style ==
Diaz has stated that she creates art to express her objections against “patriarchal values, political deception, and political ideology”. She has also commented that one of the main purposes of her artwork is to explore the sublimity of women. She uses various forms of medium to convey her messages, including video and installations; her preferred medium is her own body. She states that “[her] body is the vehicle to transport a big load of [her] own life experience; touching the limits is the way [she gets] intimate with [her] own body and the work”. Furthermore, she states that "by using [her] body like a medium, [she] conveys [her] objections with political disappointments, the patriarchal companies, and discriminating philosophies." Her work is meant to express the different "facets of being a woman, a mother, a victim, and an artist, and so forth."

== "Borderline" ==
One of her most prominent works is “Borderline,” which is a video performance created in 2005 that is featured in the E Pluribus Unum: Out of Many, One exhibition at Studios at the Park in Paso Robles, California. “Borderline” was set in the ocean, where Diaz actually sat herself in an enclosed wooden box and was launched into the ocean for 45 minutes without any means of protection. Adela explains that the purpose behind this video performance is to enhance the discussion on the injustices that exist in the United States toward immigrants. It demonstrate the instability that exists in the lives of migrants who reside in the U.S., through their marginalization and the discrimination that they are forced to endure. Diaz mentions that her personal experience as an immigrant in the United States is reflected in this video performance. 2005, aside from being the year that she created this art piece, was also a detrimental year for her legal status. She states that through the making of this piece, she risked her own life not only in terms of dying but also of getting caught by the police who could potentially deport her back to Guatemala. She mentions that a part of her desired for this to occur. This artwork was meant to provide a voice for the millions of men and women who are trapped in similar situations.

== Select artwork ==
- Detachment, 2007, Video Performance
  - This piece shows two women, mother and daughter, in red dresses who are stitched together, and as they begin to move in opposite ways, the stitching is destroyed. In the description of the video performance, Maria Adela Diaz discusses the detachment that occurs between a mother and her daughter: “The bond between a mother and daughter wavers throughout its evolution. The most prevalent, and possibly most taboo, is the separation of ideologies and disruption of communication. Daily life turns into steps in opposite directions. In this video, I demonstrate the detachment between a mother and daughter while maintaining an invisible umbilical cord that once linked us together but only remains metaphorically. Once detached, the only thing that remains and links the two is blood”
- Blossom, 2008, Video Performance
  - This piece depicts a young woman running and jumping in what seems to be a field of flowers. According to Diaz, it is representative of the growth and maturity human beings experience as time passes.
- CAUTION, 2008, Video Art
  - This video portrays what seems to be a father, mother, and their daughter running while the sun is going down. It reminds viewers of the immigration signs placed at the borders as warning signs. Diaz states that she recreated the sign into video art in order to send the message that the crossing of borders should be a legal action. The continuous looping of the video empowers her idea because it helps to demonstrate that crossing borders is uncontrollable, either by laws or through other forms of higher powers.
- Status Quo, 2017, Performance
  - This performance piece displays a woman trapped in her personal space, and then a group of men begin to weld pieces of metal to create a structure that entraps the woman and does not allow her to escape. The woman then begins to fight for her way out by breaking the structure. Diaz provides commentary on her work: "[it] denounces the inert behavior of Latin American societies when it comes to [denouncing] violent and abusive events that occur near them [or] even in their own personal intimate space. Her body trapped and invaded are analogies to the Latin American cultures that oppresses and violates the women body".
- Antipodes, Installation/ Video Performance
  - This performance piece of 100 shoes that were connected by the same sole is—based on Diaz's commentary— representative of how unity between humanity will help towards achieving and creating a better world.
- Resistance, Performance, Action
  - Resistance is similar to Detachment in that it shows three women, who are stitched together through pink shirts, attempting to move away from one another until the stitching is destroyed. Diaz mentions that her piece is meant to explore the pain that is created through detachment, as was commonly experienced during the military regimes that were in power in Guatemala and other Latin American countries. Millions of people were separated from their families and friends; it was common for people to be tortured, kidnapped, or killed.
- Rastros, 2018, Video Performance
  - In 2017, about 412 deaths were recorded of migrants who died while crossing the U.S.-Mexican border. Diaz states that the pieces symbolize the immigration laws that are passed in the U.S. in order to dehumanize migrants. The border represents a piece of territory where body parts are found, often unable to be identified.

== Exhibitions ==
Maria Adela Diaz has been featured in exhibitions all over the world, including "the Centre Pompidou in Paris, Exteresa Arte Actual in Mexico City, and Museo de Arte Contemporáneo in San Jose, Costa Rica." She has exhibited alongside other artists, including: Isabel Barbuzza, Ana de Obregoso, Kate Leffer, Linda Vallejo, Bianca Ana Chavez, and Anais Yu Ye.

- Radical Women: Latin American Art, 1960–1985
  - Radical Women: Latin American Art, 1960–1985 displays the work of Latina and Chicana women artists created during a period of Latin American history representative of both repressive times as well as liberal ones. During the times these artists created their artworks, many of their respective countries were experiencing social and political upheaval, including dictatorships and civil wars. Many of the art presented in this exhibition is centered around the rejection of repressive regimes as well as patriarchal culture.
- E Pluribus Unum: From Many, One
  - This exhibition, executed by Studios on the Park during June 2017, encouraged guests to participate in examining how immigration has impacted their daily lives as well as the national culture. It encouraged guests to evaluate their own perceptions on such a controversial issue, despite the fact that America "is and always has been a nation of immigrants."
- Other exhibitions include:
  - Group and solo exhibitions

1999

- "BOCETOS PRIMERAS IMPRESIONES" (Sketch exhibit First Impressions) Museum of Modern Art, Guatemala, Guatemala. Curated by COLLOQUIA.

2000

- "EN NOMBRE DE LA OBRA"; Young Creators Bancafe, Guatemala, Guatemala. Curated by Rosina Cazali.
- "OCTUBRE AZUL" "AMBROSIA", Park of The Sacrarium, Guatemala, Guatemala. Curated by Rosina Cazali.
- "TRIPIARTE", "SIMBIOSIS INTERUMPIDA", Post building, Guatemala, Guatemala.

2001

- "IV CARIBBEAN BIENNIAL", Santo Domingo, RepÃºblica Dominicana. Guatemalan participation. Curated by Rosina Cazali.
- "SUYO AJENO/ AJENO SUYO", Ex-Teresa Arte Actual, México, city. Curated by Guillermo Santa Marina.

2005

- "Contemporary Latin American Art Group Show", NYC, NY. Curated by Risa Needleman Gallery.
- "MIGRACIONES", BORDERLINE, Cultura HispÃ¡nica / Centro Cultural de EspaÃ±a, Guatemala, Guatemala. Curated by Rosina Cazali.

2006

- December 2006 "TRAFICOS", Estrecho Dudoso, Teoretica, San Jose, Costa Rica. Curated by Tamara Diaz y Virginia Perez Raton.
- "CIELO ALREVES" Caída Libre, Centro Cultural de España, Guatemala, Guatemala. Curated by Rosina Cazali, Luis Gonzalez Palma, Emiliano Valdes.
- Online Exhibition: IMAGINING OURSELVES: Global Voices from a New Generation of Woman. April: money, IMAGINING OURSELVES: "Untitled Women"
- "real pARTy 06"; Real Art Ways, Hartford, Connecticut. April 8.
- Online Exhibition: IMAGINING OURSELVES: Global Voices from a New Generation of Woman.
- "Naderias", Teoretica, a public intervention project.San Jose, Costa Rica. Curated by Tamara Diaz.
- "ARMI DELLA PROSSIMITA. Tra performance e arti visive"; NABA, Nuova Accademia di Belle Arti di Milano. Milano, Italy. Curated by Lorenza Pignatti.

2007

- "PHOTOQUAI" Theatre Claude Levi-Strauss, Paris, France.
- "III ENCUENTRO DE ARTE CORPORAL" Instituto de las artes la imagen y el espacio, Caracas, Venezuela.
- July 2007 "T WHAT?", Photo Biennale, Louisville Kentucky.
- January 2007 "ART FOR ARTS SHAKE", La contaminazione dello spazio, Bologna, Italy.

2008

- "MIRANDO AL SUR" Traveling art show, countries on display: Guatemala, Costa Rica, Miami, from Dec.12.2008 to Jan.6.2009.
- "EXONOME Mexican Consulate, San Francisco, CA. Nov. 18, 2008.
- "The Environmental Paradigm, Mina Dresden Gallery, San Francisco, CA. August 1, 2008. Curated by Cecilia Nuin.
- 16 Bienal de Arte Paiz, Guatemala City, Guatemala, July 5–20. Artistic Director: Nelson Herrera Ysla. Curators: Miguel Flores Castellanos, Rosina Cazali, Victor Martinez, Guillermo Monsanto, and Valia Garzon.
- "Horror vacui, Primera muestra de performance y accionismo, Centro de Formacion de la Cooperacion Espanola, La Antigua Guatemala, Guatemala, June 7,08. Curated by Rosina Cazali.
- "Memento Mori", F.U.E.L Collection April 4–19, Philadelphia, PA.
- What Does a Woman Want?, Proyecto X, San Francisco, California, March 7–9. Curated by Cecilia Nuin.
- "Le peuple qui manque", Paris France.

2009

- Feminist Art-Action" Panorama of the feminist video-performance contemporary Latin-American, Oblo Cinema Laussane, Switzerland. November 18–19, 2009.
- "Elles" Art Action Feministe, Centro Pompidou, Paris, France. June 17, 2009.
- "Performar" Dominican Republic, April 20, 2009.
- "Performing Localities" Recent Guatemalan Performance Art on Video, Tuesday 5 May 2009, Royal College of Art in collaboration with INIVA at Rivington Place. Supported by the Monique Beudert Fund.
- "Persona que tiene Alma" muestra intinerante, Patagonia, Argentina. March 20, 2009.
- "Solo Mujeres" Mission Cultural Center for Latino Arts, San Francisco. February 20, 2009.
- "Mi Urano Destino" Traveling pop Art Exhibition, Centro Cultural de Espana Guatemala, Guatemala.January 24, 2009.

2010

- "Muestra Internacional de Cine Realizado por Mujeres", Screening at Centro de Historia, Zaragoza, Spain, March 13- 21st. Organized by Fanny Guerineau from Seminario Interdisciplinario de Estudios de la Mujer (SIEM), Universidad de Zaragoza,
- "Wonder & Vital", Video exhibition Organized by Femlink, May, 2010 Paris, France.
- "Femmeusesaction #19" Vivat (Armentières), Paris France, January 28—February 4. Curated by Choreographer Cécile Proust.

2011

- "Númina Femenina", Mexican Consulate, Oct 13- Dec 13, 2011. Curated by Ana Labastida and Frida Cano.

2014

- "Attraversamenti” Ostuni, Plugia, Italy. Sept. 5- 7. Curated by Benedetta di Loreto.

2015

- "El Sueño Interrumpido", Centro Cultural Metropolitano, Guatemala City. Curated by Lucrecia Cofiño and Javier Payeras.

2016

- "POLITICAL BODIES 16th Performance Art Festival", Osijek Croatia October 14–15. Curated by Iva Rada Jancovik.

2017

- "Status Quo" C41 Gallery, Antigua Guatemala. Curated by Rosina Cazali, Anabella Acevedo.
- "Border of Visibility" Slovenian Biennale, Museo of Art, Osijek Croatia. Curated by Valentina Rados.

2018

- "Encuentros" International video Art Exhibition, Museo y Centro de Estudios Humanísticos de la Universidad de Turabo, Puerto Rico. Curated by Emilia Quiñonez and Ernesto Calvo.

== Artist talks/ participation ==
- "CREATIVETIME SUMMIT", Artist Talk, "Violence, Migration, Cultural memory and resistance in the Contemporary Cultural production of Central American Diaspora. Nov 1-3, 2018.
- "LATINO ART NOW", Artist Talk, Chicago, May 8–9, 2016.
- California State University Northridge, Artist Talk @ the Central American Studies, May 8, 2012.
- "Public Art", Central American Art Week, Sponsored by California State University Northridge, Central American Studies, Liberal Studies program, Chicano Studies Department, CAUSA. April 28, 2009.
- "Resolution 3" LACE(Los Angeles Contemporary Exhibitions), Los Angeles, CA. October 25 & 26, 2008. A conversation with Alex Villar(NY) Narrowcast: Reframing Global Video 1986/2008. Resolution 3 is co-directed by Pitzer College Associate Professor of Media Studies Ming-Yuen S. Ma and LACE Executive Director Carol Stakenas.
- "Marina Triste Borracha" August 30, 2008, Presentación del disco.
- "TRANSITORY PUBLICO/PUBLIC TRANSITORIO", Political art that is refreshingly amoral, Sponsored by UCLAs Latin American Institute Center for the study of women, chicano studies research center art. Artist Presentation, From the Visible to the Invisible, LACE, Hollywood, CA. 2007.
- "Performance Art Immigration Festival", Artist Presentation, Central American Studies Program, California State University, Northridge. 2006.
- "Women without Borders", A conference by and for Central American Women, Speaker, Sin Fronteras and Casas(Central American Studies Alumni Society) Northridge, CA, 2006.

== Grants ==
- "Myrna Mack", First place on the Poster Contest, Guatemala, 2006.
- "Cielo Alreves", Centro Cultural de España, Guatemala, 2006.
- "Jovenes Creadores Bancafe", Guatemala, Guatemala, 2000.

== Current life ==
Maria Adela Diaz lives in Los Angeles and works as an art director.
