= María Alejandra Díaz =

Venezuelan politician

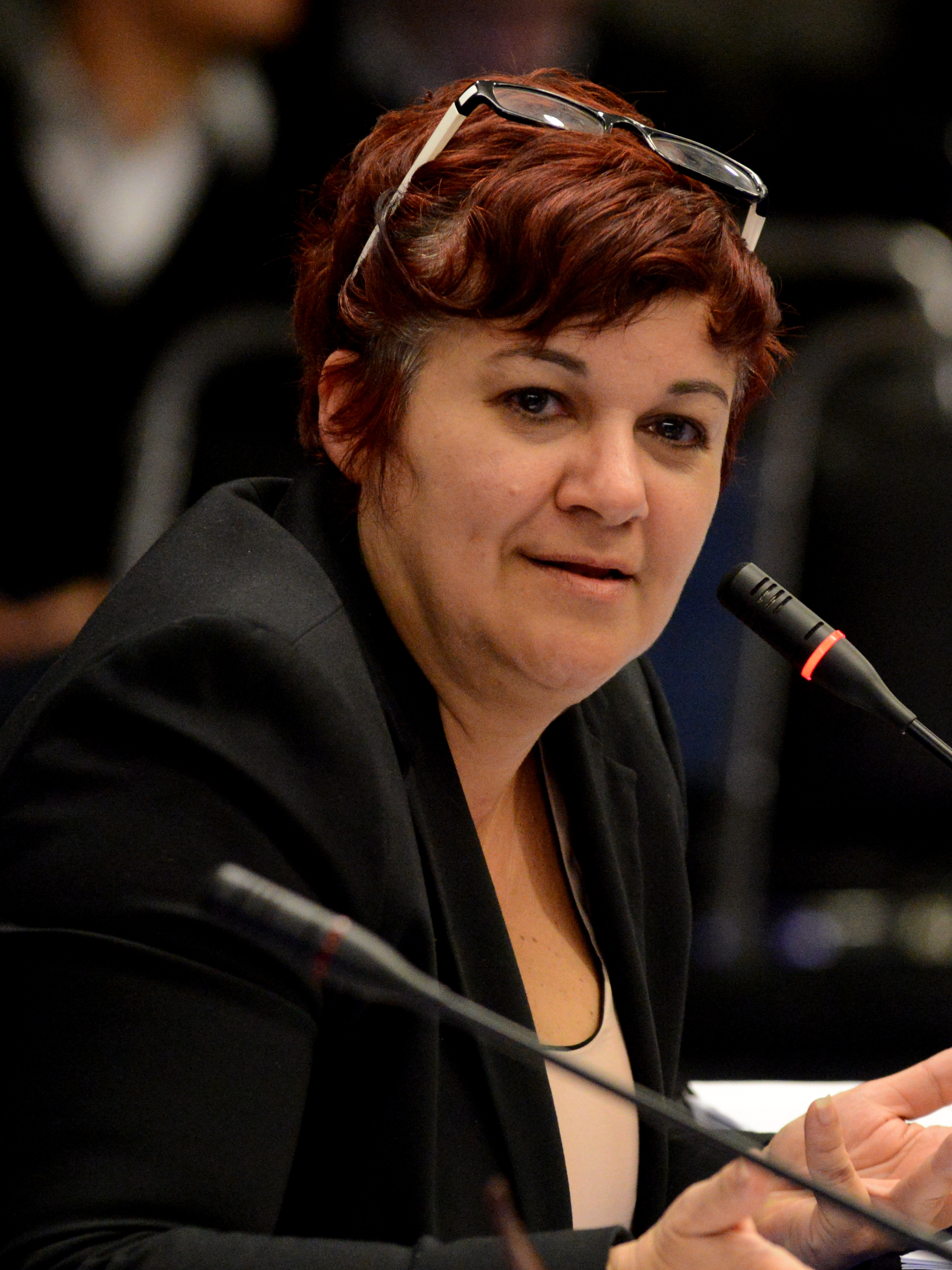
María Alejandra Díaz at the Inter-American Commission of Human Rights

María Alejandra Díaz is a Venezuelan politician. She served as a member of the 2017 Constituent National Assembly of Venezuela.

She graduated from the Universidad Santa María (Venezuela) in 1989.

She has caused controversy by making claims not supported by medical science to have found a cure for COVID-19.
