= Naciones Unidas Park =

The Naciones Unidas Park (Spanish: Parque Naciones Unidas or Parque de las Naciones Unidas) may refer to:

- Naciones Unidas National Park, Guatemala
- Naciones Unidas El Picacho Park, Tegucigalpa, Honduras: site of El Cristo del Picacho statue
- Parque Naciones Unidas, a sports complex in Caracas, Venezuela; home of the Cocodrilos de Caracas basketball team
