= Amatitlán =

- Municipality
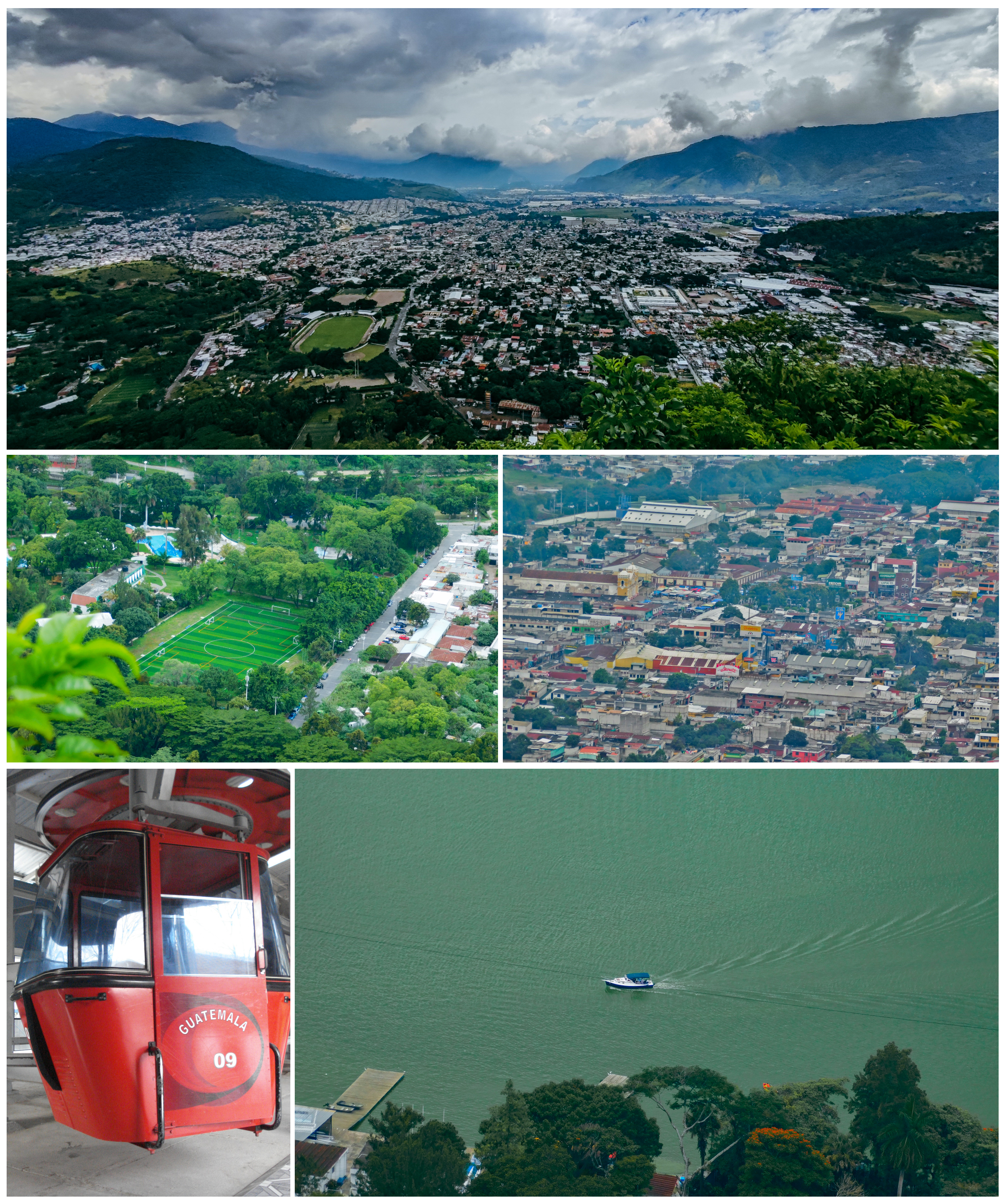
- Clockwise from top: View of Amatitlán, another panoramic view, Lake Amatitlán, the main cable car of the city, Amatitlán's main sports court.

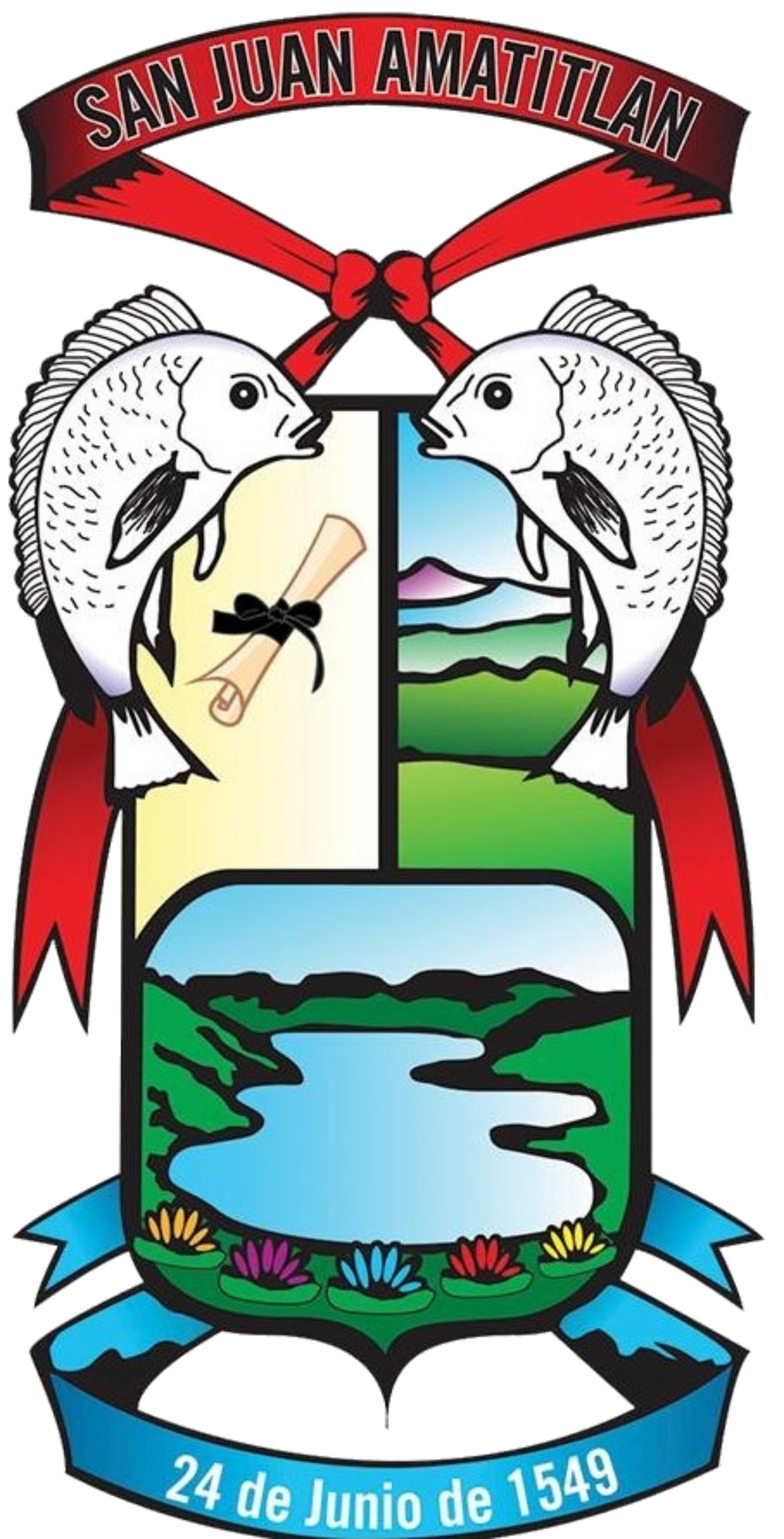
- Flag Seal

- Location in Guatemala
- Coordinates: 14°29′N 90°37′W
- Country: Guatemala
- Department: Guatemala Department

Government
  - Mayor: Mara Marroquín Flores (2016-2020) (UNE)

Area
  - Total: 44 sq mi (113 km^{2})
- Elevation: 3,898 ft (1,188 m)

Population (2018 census)
  - Total: 116,711
  - Density: 2,680/sq mi (1,030/km^{2})
- Climate: Aw

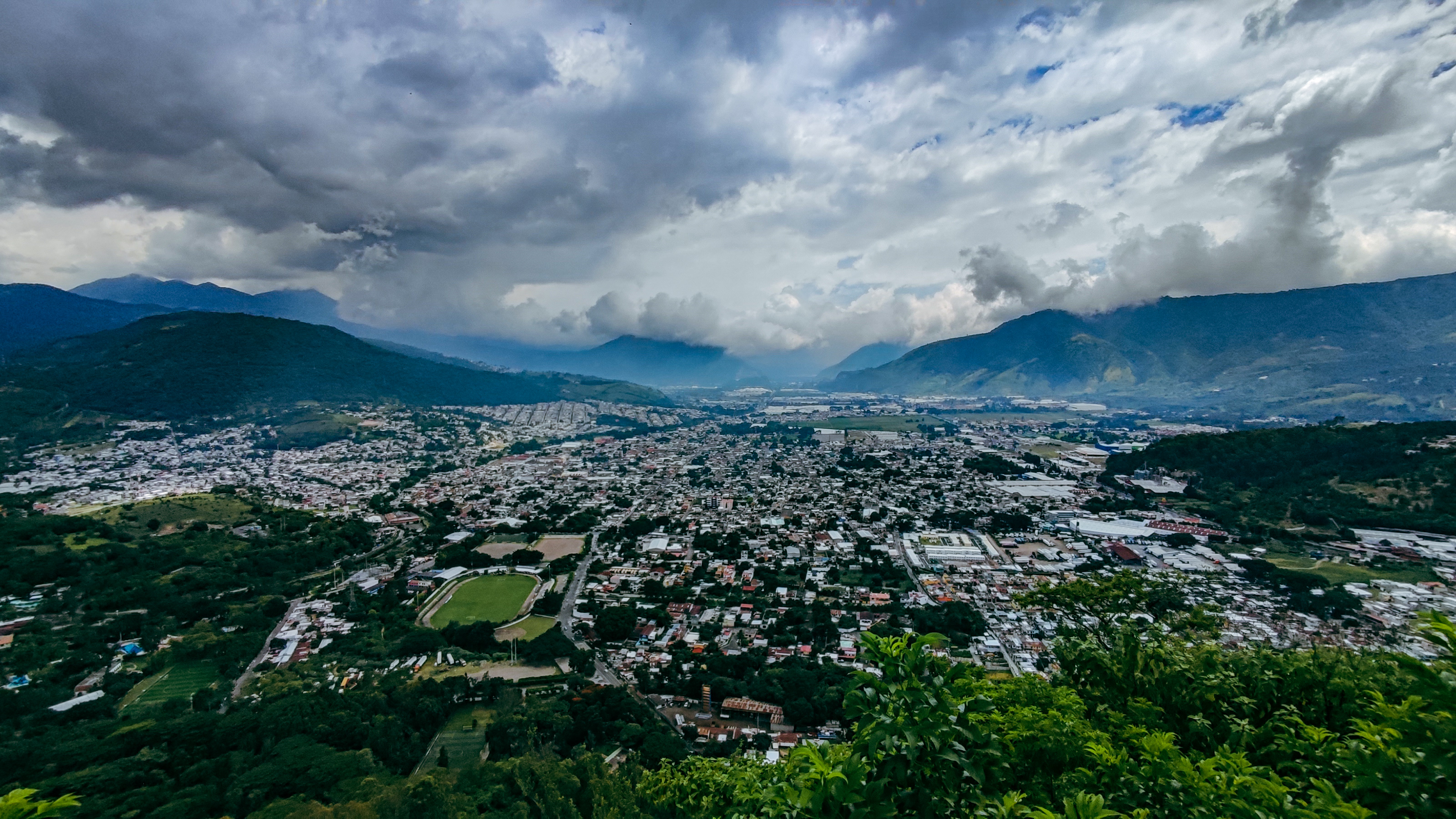
Aerial view of the city

Amatitlán (Spanish pronunciation: [amatiˈtlan]) is a town, with a population of 98,176 (2018 census), and a municipality in the Guatemala department of Guatemala.

== History ==
=== Monastery and doctrine of Order of Preachers ===
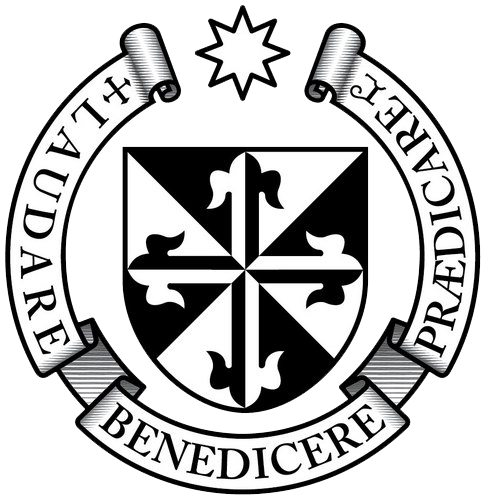
Order of Preachers coat of arms.

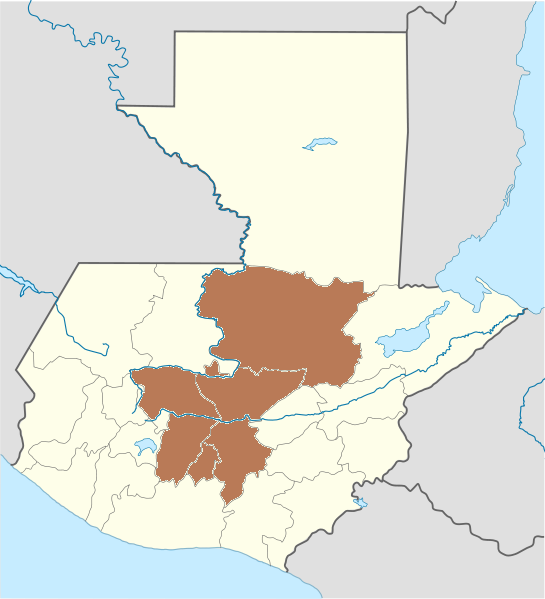
Order of Preachers convents during the Spanish colony en Guatemala and the approximate area of their surrounding doctrines

After the conquest, the Spanish crown focused on the Catholic indoctrination of the natives. Human settlements founded by royal missionaries in the New World were called "Indian doctrines" or simply "doctrines". Originally, friars had only temporary missions: teach the Catholic faith to the natives, and then transfer the settlements to secular parishes, just like the ones that existed in Spain at the time; the friars were supposed to teach Spanish and Catholicism to the natives. And when the natives were ready, they could start living in parishes and contribute with mandatory tithing, just like the people in Spain.

But this plan never materialized, mainly because the Spanish crown lost control of the regular orders as soon as their friars set course to America. Shielded by their apostolic privileges granted to convert natives into Catholicism, the missionaries only responded to their order local authorities, and never to that of the Spanish government or the secular bishops. The orders local authorities, in turn, only dealt with their own order and not with the Spanish crown. Once a doctrine had been established, they protected their own economic interests, even against those of the King and thus, the doctrines became Indian towns that remain unaltered for the rest of the Spanish colony.

The doctrines were founded at the friars discretion, given that they were completely at liberty to settle communities provided the main purpose was to eventually transfer it as a secular parish which would be tithing of the bishop. In reality, what happened was that the doctrines grew uncontrollably and were never transferred to any secular parish; they formed around the place where the friars had their monastery and from there, they would go out to preach to settlements that belong to the doctrine and were called "annexes", "visits" or "visit towns". Therefore, the doctrines had three main characteristics:

1. they were independent from external controls (both ecclesiastical and secular)
2. were run by a group of friars
3. had a relatively larger number of annexes.

The main characteristic of the doctrines was that they were run by a group of friars, because it made sure that the community system would continue without any issue when one of the members died.

In 1638, the Order of Preachers split their large doctrines —which meant large economic benefits for them— in groups centered around each one of their six monasteries, including the Sacapulas monastery:

Order of Preachers' doctrines in Guatemala in 1638
Convent	Doctrines	Convent	Doctrines
Guatemala	Chimaltenango; Jocotenango; Sumpango; San Juan Sacatepéquez; San Pedro Sacatepéquez; Santiago Sacatepéquez; Rabinal; San Martín Jilotepeque; Escuintla; Milpas Altas; Milpas Bajas; San Lucas Sacatepéquez; Santo Domingo neighborhood	Amatitlán	Amatitlán; Petapa; Mixco; San Cristóbal Palín
Guatemala	Chimaltenango; Jocotenango; Sumpango; San Juan Sacatepéquez; San Pedro Sacatepéquez; Santiago Sacatepéquez; Rabinal; San Martín Jilotepeque; Escuintla; Milpas Altas; Milpas Bajas; San Lucas Sacatepéquez; Santo Domingo neighborhood	Verapaz	Cahabón; Cobán; Chamelco; San Cristóbal; Tactic
Guatemala	Chimaltenango; Jocotenango; Sumpango; San Juan Sacatepéquez; San Pedro Sacatepéquez; Santiago Sacatepéquez; Rabinal; San Martín Jilotepeque; Escuintla; Milpas Altas; Milpas Bajas; San Lucas Sacatepéquez; Santo Domingo neighborhood	Sonsonate	Nahuizalco; Tacuxcalco
San Salvador	Apastepeque; Chontales; Cojutepeque; Cuscatlán; Milpas Bajas; Tonacatepeque	Sacapulas	Sacapulas; Cunén; Nebaj; Santa Cruz; San Andrés Sajcabajá; Zacualpa; Chichicastenango

In 1754, the Order of Preachers had to transfer all of their doctrines and convents to the secular clergy, as part of the Bourbon reforms.

=== Amatitlán Department creation ===
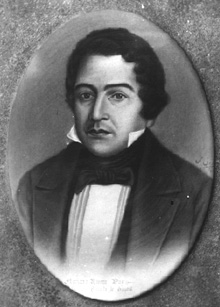
Portrait of Mariano Rivera Paz. Rivera Paz was governor of the State of Guatemala when he created Amatitlán as an independent district in 1839.

After the independence of Central America, and during governor Mariano Rivera Paz's time in office, a decree issued on 6 November 1839 created a new independent district called Amatitlán which also included Palín and Villa Nueva. The decree says:

1. "The city of Amatitlán, San Cristóbal Palín, Villa Nueva, San Miguel and Santa Inés Petapa and all the locations annexed to these settlements will form an independent district for its political government and will be in charge of a Lieutenant Corregidor, who will act according to the applicable law starting on 2 October of this year and will earn a thousand pesos a year".
2. "In the same district there will be a local court to impart justice".

The district changed its name to Amatitlán Department according to the executive order of 8 May 1866 of field Marshall Vicente Cerna y Cerna government.

=== Amatitlán Department dissolution and creation of the Amatitlán municipality ===
Amatitlán Department was abolished by decree 2081 of 29 April 1935 of president general Jorge Ubico regime. This decree reads literally:

"Considering that it is convenient for the country's best interest that the Amatitlán Department be dissolved.
Decrees:

1. Amatitlán Department is abolished
2. Municipalities of Amatitlán, Villa Nueva, San Miguel Petapa and Villa Canales are incorporated into Guatemala Department and those of Palín and San Vicente Pacaya to the Escuintla Department.
3. The executive branch will issue the proper instructions to comply with this decree, which will be in effect on 1 July of this year".

=== Death of colonel Francisco Javier Arana ===
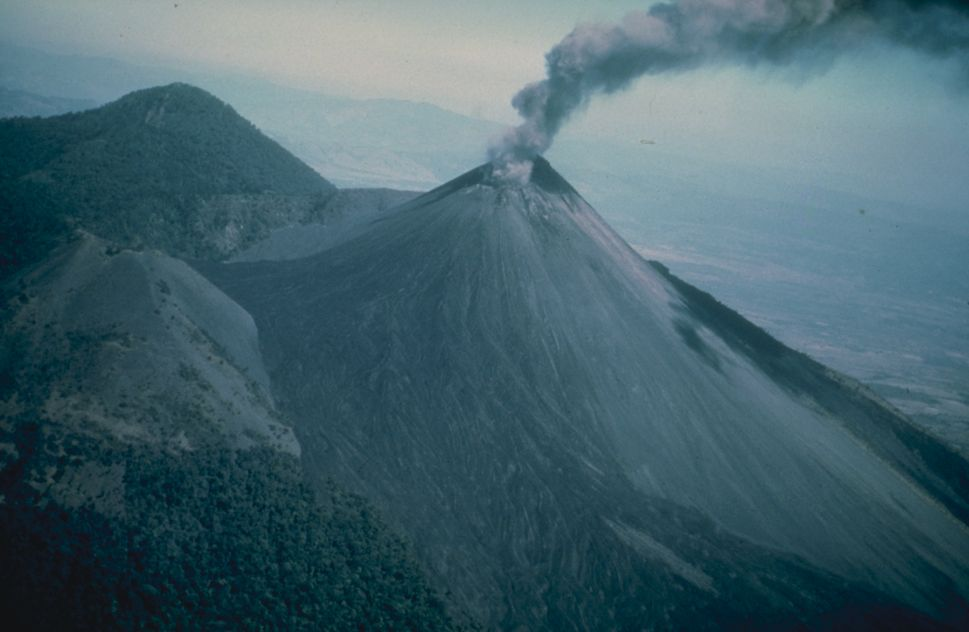
Volcán Pacaya erupting in 1976.

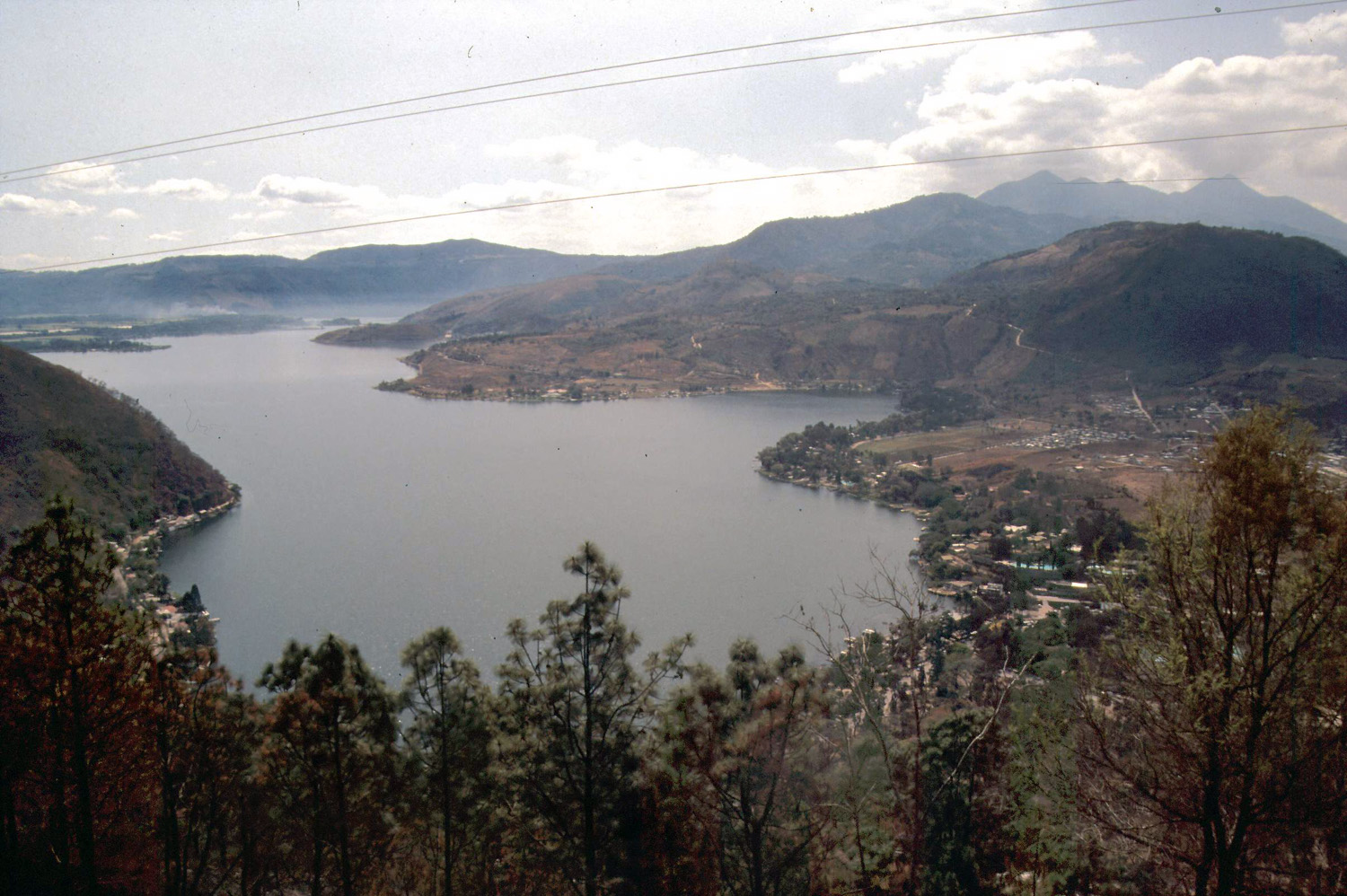
Scenic view of Lake Amatitlán from El Filón Hill.

Death of colonel Francisco Javier Arana is of critical importance for the history of Guatemala, because it was a turning point for the country's revolution in the 1940s: his death not only cleared the path for colonel Jacobo Árbenz Guzmán's election as President of Guatemala in 1950 (Note: Arbenz would be taken down by the United States United Fruit Company in June 1954, thus ending the revolution.) but also caused an acute crisis for president Juan José Arévalo, who was faced with the Army's faction loyal to colonel Arana, and to civilian groups that took advantage to protest against the government.

On 15 July 1949, colonel Francisco Javier Arana, Army Chief of Staff, presented president Juan José Arévalo with an ultimatum: if he wanted to finish the term for which he was elected, he had to fire several members of his cabinet and appoint friends of the colonel. Sure of his victory, gave Arévalo until 10:00 pm of 18 July to come up with an answer. On the morning of Monday 18 July, Arana showed up at the Presidential Palace and told Arévalo in a condescending and sarcastic tone that he was on his way to El Morlón, the presidential residence on Lake Amatitlán shore, to confiscate some arms and weapons that had been hidden there after they were confiscated from Dominican exiles in Mexico; the Guatemalan government had given the weapons to those exile to try to take down generalissimo Rafael Leónidas Trujillo in the Dominican Republic. The weapons had been taken out of the Puerto de San José military base and now Arana was on his way to take control of them in the presidential home. Historian Piero Gleijeses has said that this visit was that of an "impulsive man whose patience is gone and that went to the Palace to show off his power and to rush the humiliated president to comply with his ultimatum immediately. But far from scaring Arévalo, he put the president up to speed on his whereabouts, who rushed to set up a plan to exile Arana; dexterously, Arévalo asked him to take colonel Felipe Antonio Girón along -who was the Presidential Chief of Staff- which made Arana believe on his apparent success and that neither Arévalo or Árbenz would stand up to him.

Arévalo called Árbenz to take care of the situation and the latter sent several armed men, who left Guatemala City in two cars and were under the command of Chief of Police, lieutenant colonel Enrique Blanco and by PAR congressman Alfonso Martínez, a retired officer and friend of Árbenz. When Arana was on his way back and reached La Gloria bridge in Amatitlán, a gray Dodge was blocking his way there. A brief shooting, there were three deaths: Arana, his assistant, mayor Absalón Peralta and lieutenant colonel Blanco. Witnesses were never able to confirm what caused the fire or if Arana was put under custody as initially planned.

Upon learning the news, the Guardia de Honor battalion -loyal to Arana- rose in arms and there were combats in the city; in the end, the government took control thanks to Arbenz's decisive leadership and the lack of a leader for the rebels.

== Economy ==
The main industry of the town during colonial times was the preparation of cochineal. As of 1850, Amatitlán was producing upwards of 5,000 bales, each at 150 pounds, of cochineal. It has the largest duty-free zone in Guatemala, and a lot of maquila (garment assembly) factories, employing thousands of people, mainly women. The town lies by the side of Lake Amatitlán and it is a popular place for the middle class from Guatemala City to visit on weekends.

== Climate ==
Amatitlán has tropical climate (Köppen: Aw).

Climate data for Amatitlán
Month	Jan	Feb	Mar	Apr	May	Jun	Jul	Aug	Sep	Oct	Nov	Dec	Year
Mean daily maximum °C (°F)	26.6 (79.9)	27.3 (81.1)	28.6 (83.5)	28.6 (83.5)	28.3 (82.9)	26.7 (80.1)	26.9 (80.4)	26.9 (80.4)	26.3 (79.3)	26.2 (79.2)	25.9 (78.6)	26.0 (78.8)	27.0 (80.6)
Daily mean °C (°F)	20.7 (69.3)	21.1 (70.0)	22.3 (72.1)	22.7 (72.9)	22.9 (73.2)	22.1 (71.8)	22.1 (71.8)	22.0 (71.6)	21.7 (71.1)	21.4 (70.5)	20.7 (69.3)	20.4 (68.7)	21.7 (71.0)
Mean daily minimum °C (°F)	14.9 (58.8)	15.0 (59.0)	16.0 (60.8)	16.9 (62.4)	17.5 (63.5)	17.5 (63.5)	17.3 (63.1)	17.1 (62.8)	17.1 (62.8)	16.6 (61.9)	15.6 (60.1)	14.9 (58.8)	16.4 (61.5)
Average precipitation mm (inches)	1 (0.0)	1 (0.0)	4 (0.2)	27 (1.1)	122 (4.8)	253 (10.0)	200 (7.9)	177 (7.0)	237 (9.3)	135 (5.3)	17 (0.7)	3 (0.1)	1,177 (46.4)
Source: Climate-Data.org

== Maps ==
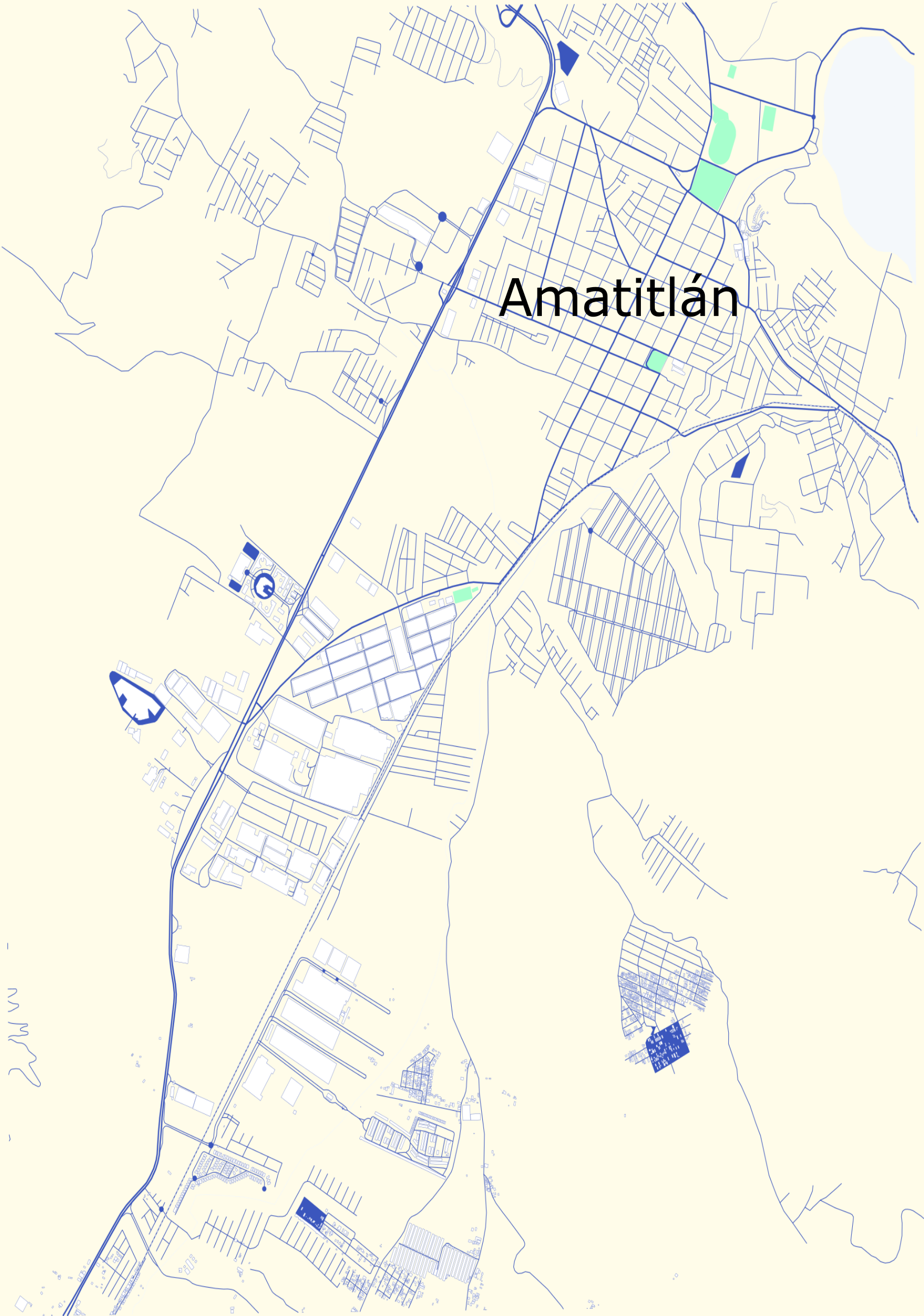
Map of Amatitlán

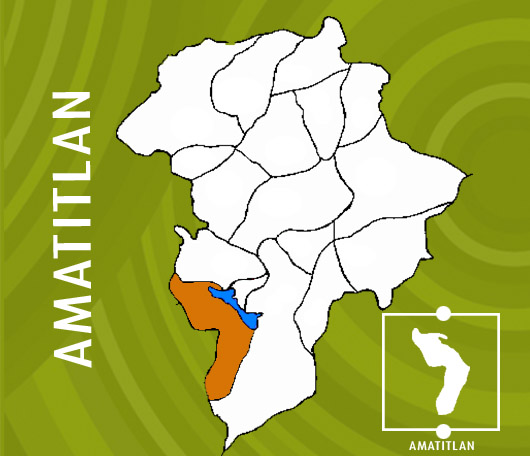
Location of Amatitlán

== See also ==
- Guatemala Department
- List of places in Guatemala

== Notes and references ==
=== Bibliography ===
- Belaubre, Christopohe (2001). "Poder y redes sociales en Centroamérica: el caso de la Orden de los Dominicos (1757-1829)" (PDF). Mesoamérica (in Spanish). 41. Archived from the original (PDF) on 21 January 2015.
- Gleijeses, Piero (1990). "The Death of Francisco Arana: a turning point in the Guatemalan Revolution" (PDF). Journal of Latin American Studies. 22 (3). UK: 527–552. doi:10.1017/S0022216X00020940.
- Juarros, Domingo (1818). Compendio de la historia de la Ciudad de Guatemala (in Spanish). Guatemala: Ignacio Beteta.
- Municipalidad de Palín (2007). "Municipalidad de Palín - Historia". Municipalidad de Palín (in Spanish). Archived from the original on 9 December 2007.
- van Oss, Adriaan C. (1986). Catholic Colonialism: A Parish History of Guatemala, 1524-1821. Cambridge, UK: Cambridge University Press. ISBN 9780521527125.
