= Julio Armando Cobar Stadium =

Stadium in San Miguel Petapa, Guatemala

Coordinates: 14°30′7″N 90°33′28″W

Estadio Julio Armando Cobar
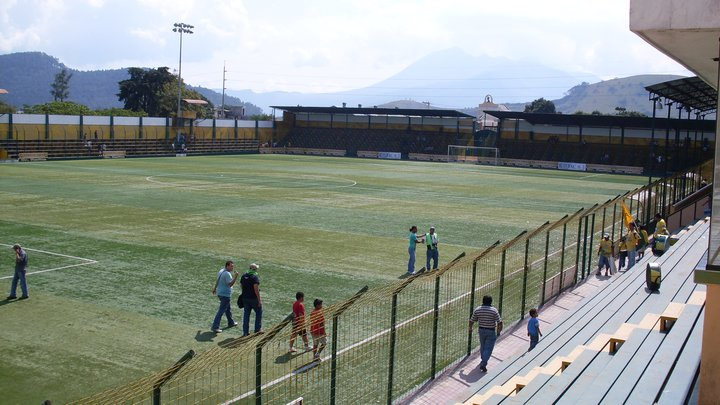
- Interactive map of Estadio Julio Armando Cobar
- Former names: Estadio Municipal de San Miguel Petapa
- Location: San Miguel Petapa, Guatemala
- Owner: Municipality of San Miguel Petapa
- Capacity: 7,500
- Surface: Artificial turf
- Field size: 110 m × 68 m (361 ft × 223 ft)

Construction
- Opened: 1979
- Renovated: 2008
- Cost: Q 5,015,908 ($650,000)
- Architect: Harry Payne

Tenants
- C.D. Petapa (1979–2021); Aurora FC (2022–2023); Guatemala national football team (selected matches)

Julio Armando Cobar Stadium (Spanish: Estadio Julio Armando Cobar) is a multi-use stadium in San Miguel Petapa, Guatemala.

With artificial turf surface, it is used mostly for football and was the home stadium of Petapa. The capacity of the stadium is 7,500 people

== See also ==
- Lists of stadiums
