= San Miguel Petapa =

- Municipality
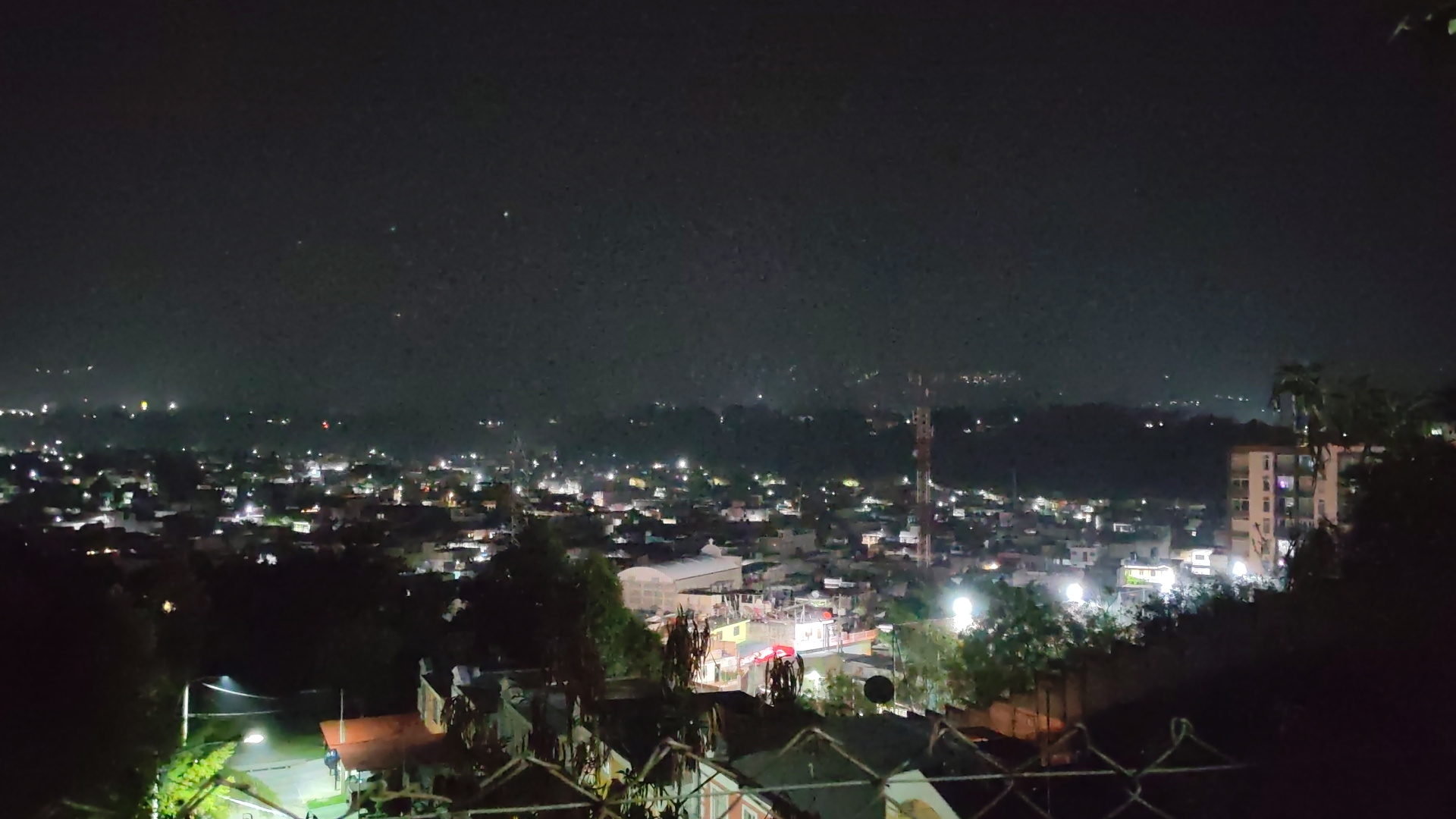
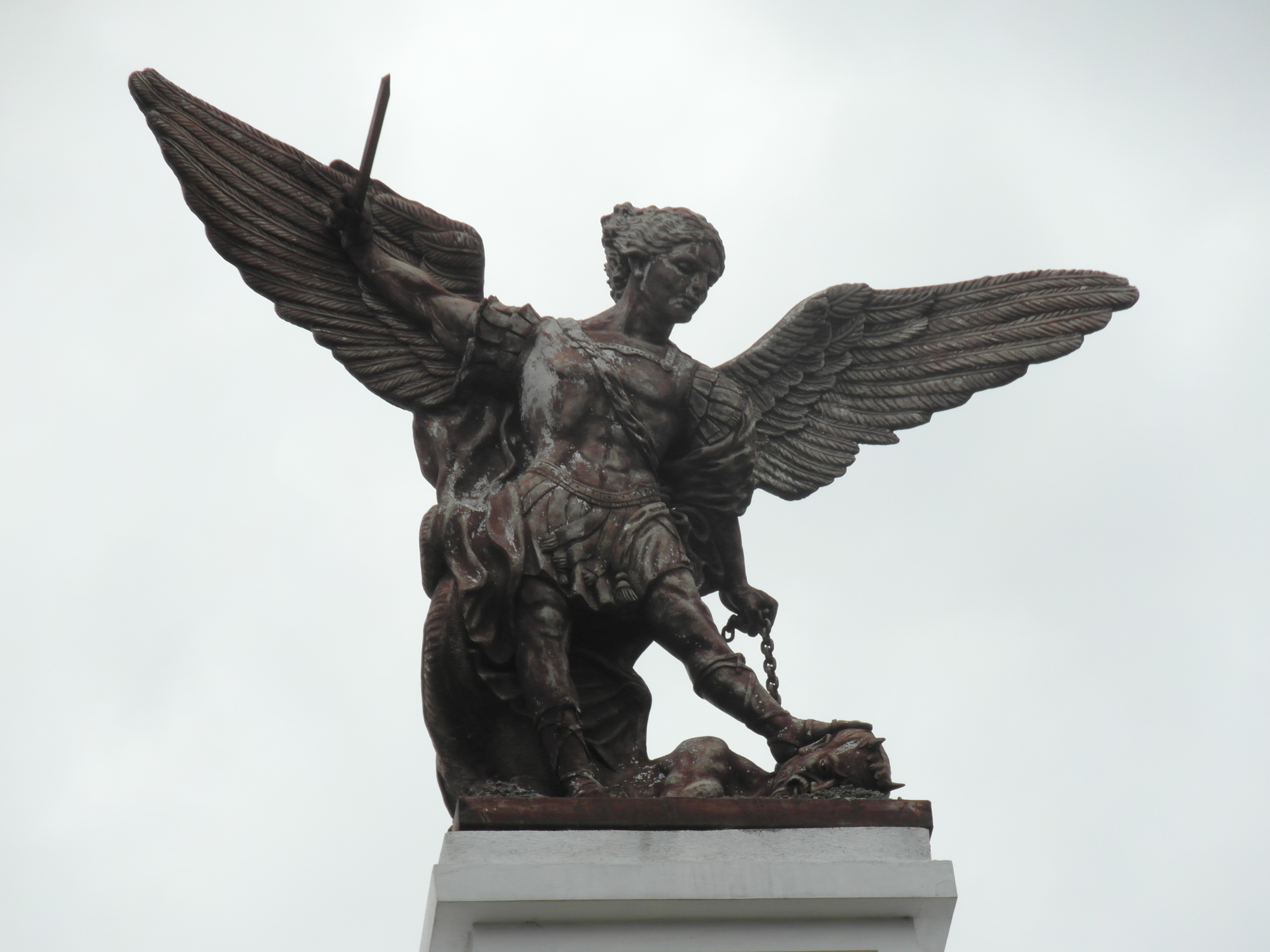
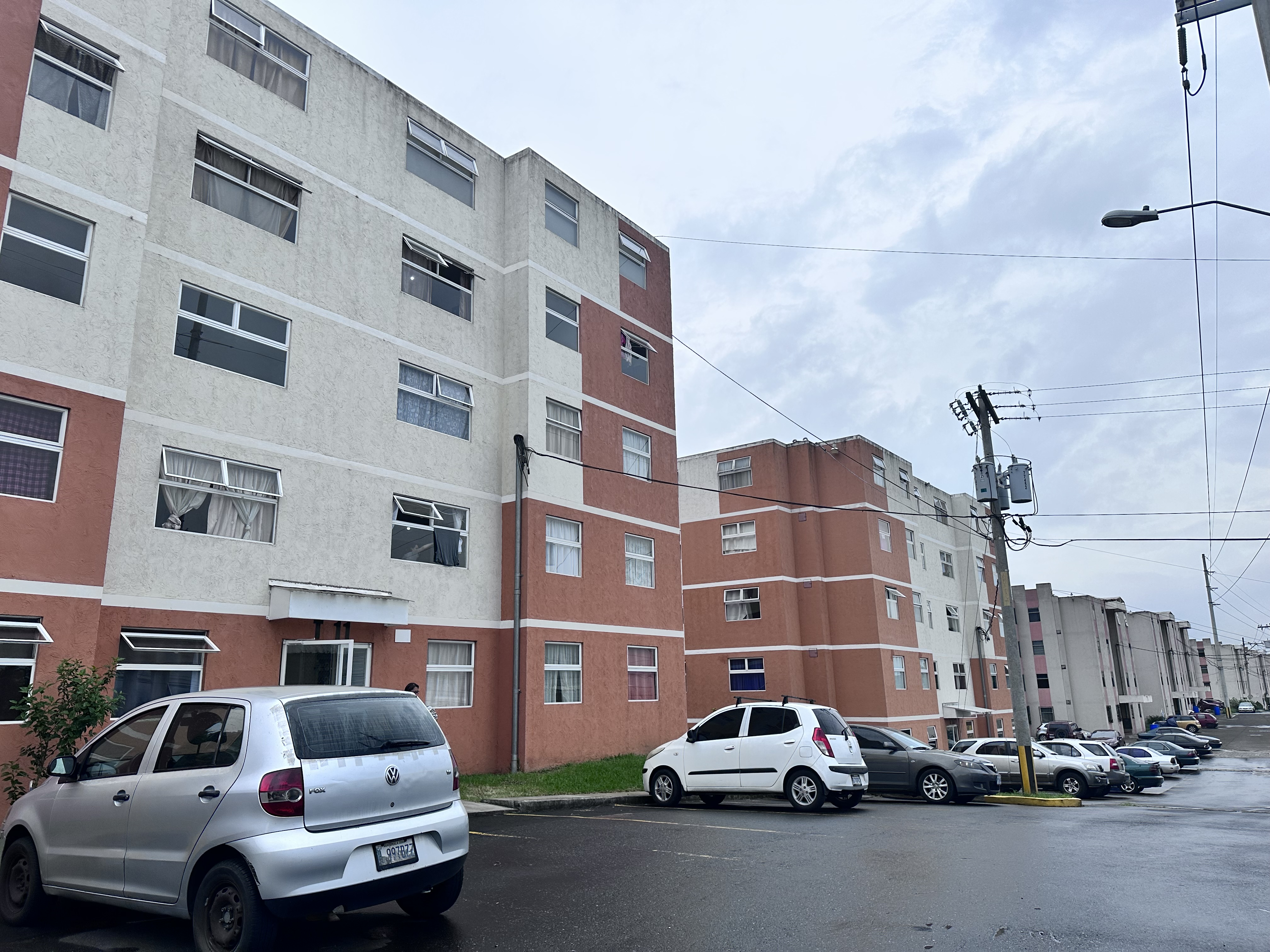
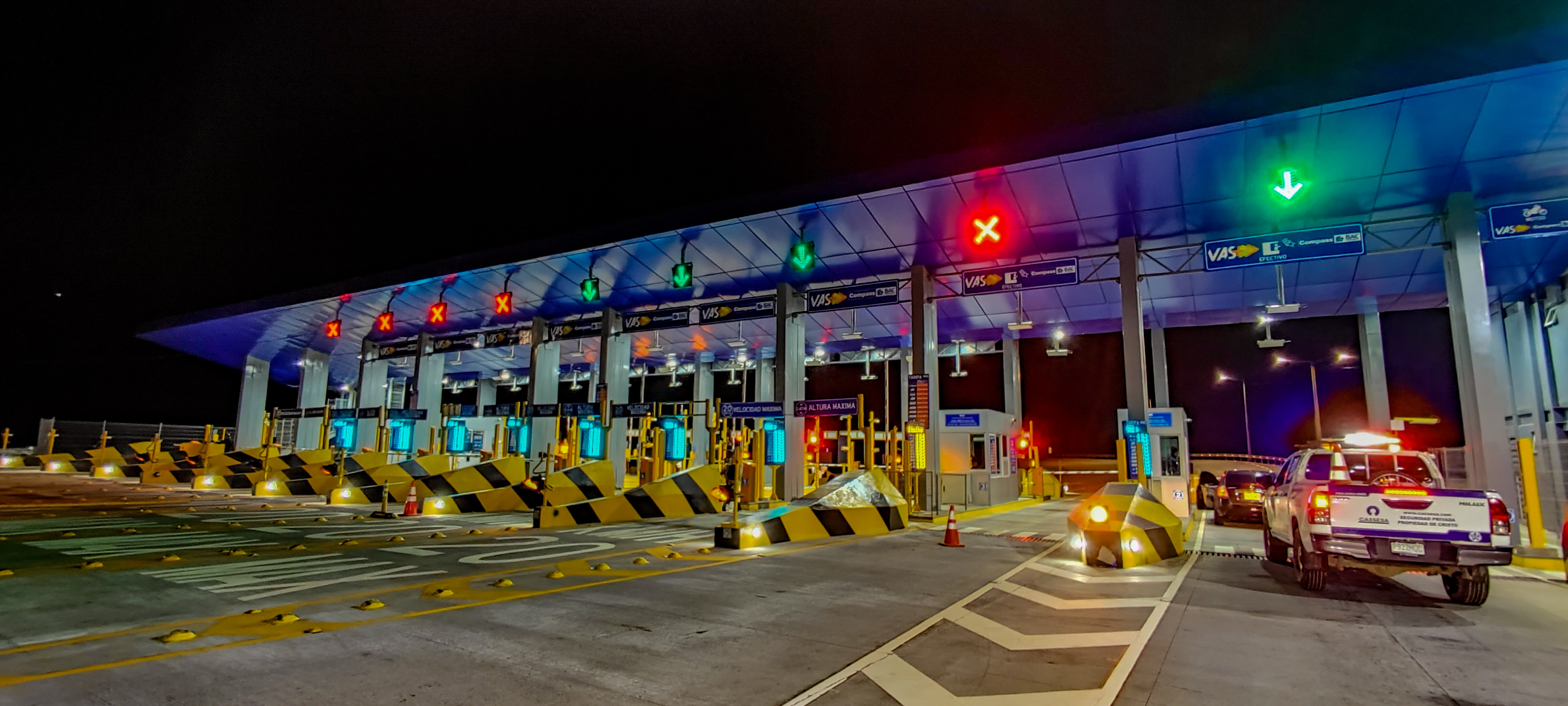
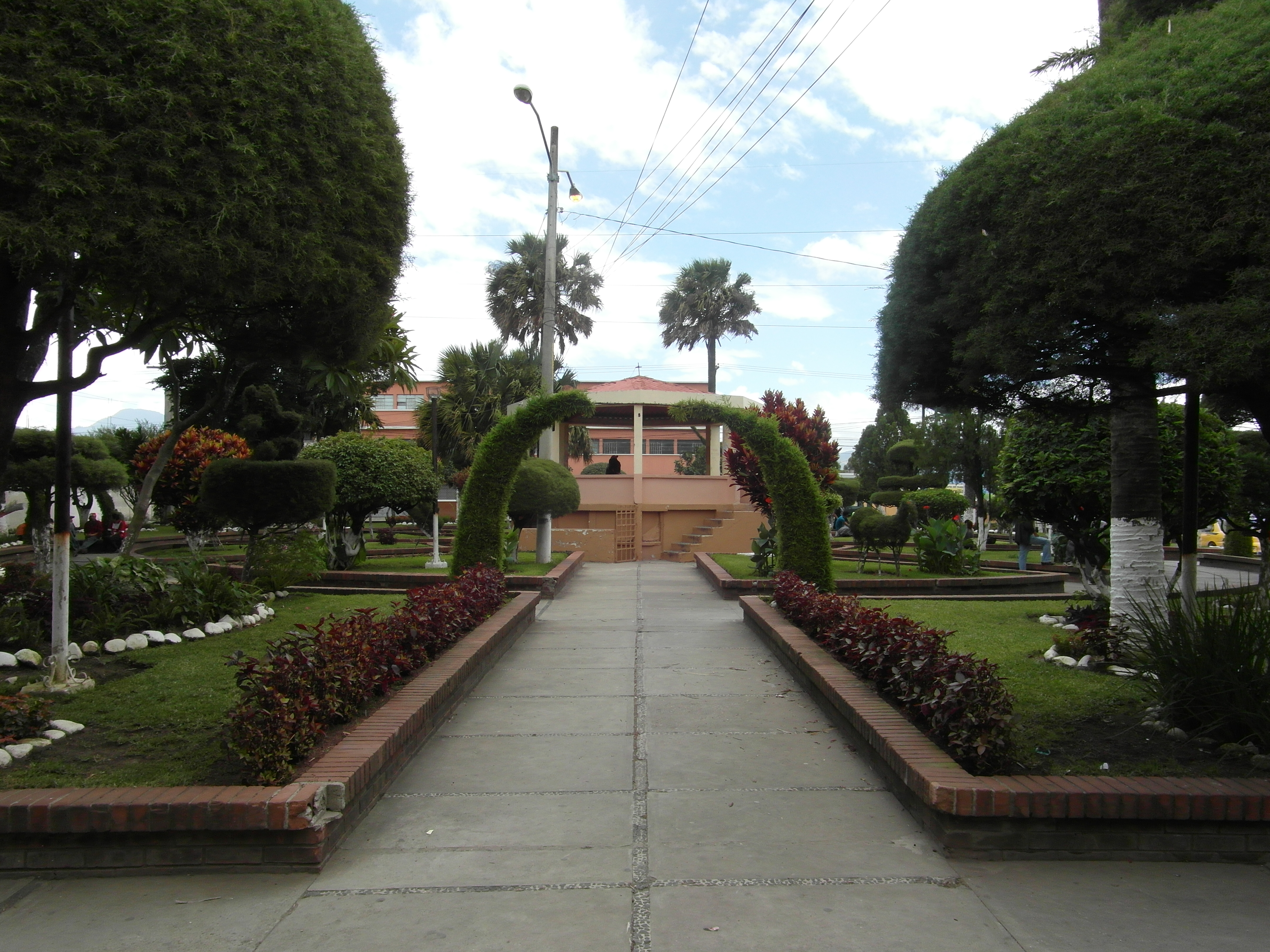
- From top, left to right: Panoramic view of San Miguel Petapa at night • Statue of a church in San Miguel Petapa • Apartment buildings in San Miguel Petapa • The toll on the Vía Alterna Sur highway • San Miguel Petapa Central Park

- Location in Guatemala
- Coordinates: 14°30′0″N 90°34′0″W
- Country: Guatemala
- Department: Guatemala

Government
  - Mayor (2016-2020): Luis Alberto Reyes (First trustee after Partido Patriota candidate Mynor Morales' candidacy was revoked)

Area
  - Municipality: 9.5 sq mi (24.6 km^{2})
- Elevation: 4,130 ft (1,260 m)

Population (2018 census)
  - Municipality: 135,447
  - Density: 14,300/sq mi (5,510/km^{2})
  - Urban: 129,124
- Climate: Aw

San Miguel Petapa (Spanish pronunciation: [ˈsam miˈɣel peˈtapa]) also known as Petapa is a city and municipality in the Guatemala department of Guatemala, located south of Guatemala City. The city has a population of 129,124 according to the 2018 census.

== History ==
=== Monastery and doctrine of Order of Preachers ===
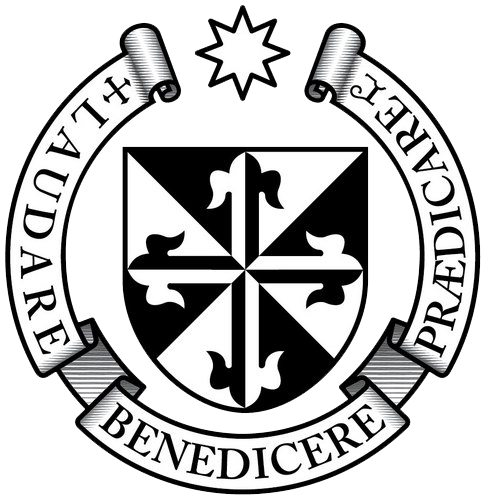
Order of Preachers coat of arms.

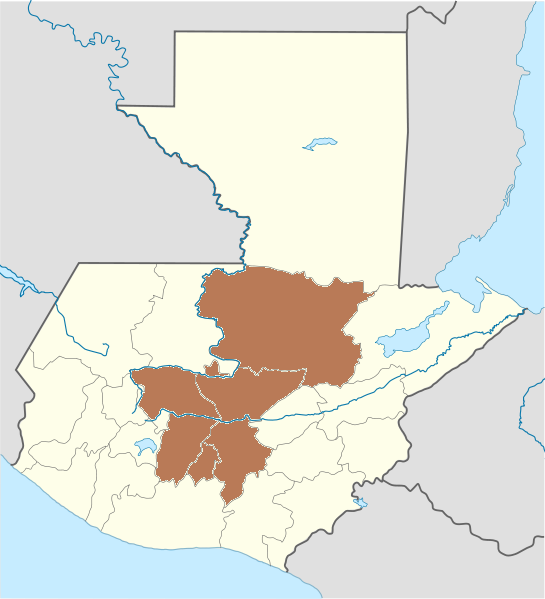
Order of Preachers convents during the Spanish colony en Guatemala and the approximate area of their surrounding doctrines

After the conquest, the Spanish crown focused on the Catholic indoctrination of the natives. Human settlements founded by royal missionaries in the New World were called "Indian doctrines" or simply "doctrines". Originally, friars had only temporary missions: teach the Catholic faith to the natives, and then transfer the settlements to secular parishes, just like the ones that existed in Spain at the time; the friars were supposed to teach Spanish and Catholicism to the natives. And when the natives were ready, they could start living in parishes and contribute with mandatory tithing, just like the people in Spain.

But this plan never materialized, mainly because the Spanish crown lost control of the regular orders as soon as their friars set course to America. Shielded by their apostolic privileges granted to convert natives into Catholicism, the missionaries only responded to their order local authorities, and never to that of the Spanish government or the secular bishops. The orders local authorities, in turn, only dealt with their own order and not with the Spanish crown. Once a doctrine had been established, the protected their own economic interests, even against those of the King and thus, the doctrines became Indian towns that remains unaltered for the rest of the Spanish colony.

The doctrines were founded at the friars discretion, given that they were completely at liberty to settle communities provided the main purpose was to eventually transfer it as a secular parish which would be tithing of the bishop. In reality, what happened was that the doctrines grew uncontrollably and were never transferred to any secular parish; they formed around the place where the friars had their monastery and from there, they would go out to preach to settlements that belong to the doctrine and were called "annexes", "visits" or "visit towns". Therefore, the doctrines had three main characteristics:

1. they were independent from external controls (both ecclesiastical and secular)
2. were run by a group of friars
3. had a relatively larger number of annexes.

The main characteristic of the doctrines was that they were run by a group of friars, because it made sure that the community system would continue without any issue when one of the members died.

In 1638, the Order of Preachers split their large doctrines —which meant large economic benefits for them— in groups centered around each one of their six monasteries; Petapa's doctrine was assigned to the Amatitlán Convent. In 1754, the Order of Preachers had to transfer all of their doctrines and convents to the secular clergy, as part of the Bourbon reforms.

=== Amatitlán Department creation ===
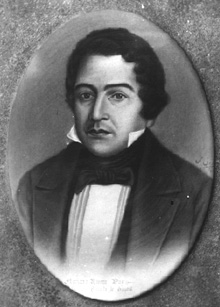
Portrait of Mariano Rivera Paz. Rivera Paz was governor of the State of Guatemala when he created Amatitlán as an independent district in 1839.

After the independence of Central America, and during governor Mariano Rivera Paz's time in office, a decree issue on 6 November 1839, created a new independent district called Amatitlán which also included Palín and Villa Nueva. The decree says:

1. "The city of Amatitlán, San Cristóbal Palín, Villa Nueva, San Miguel and Santa Inés Petapa and all the annexed locations to these settlements will form an independent district for its political government and will be in charge of a Lieutenant Corregidor, who will act according to the applicable law starting on 2 October of this year and will earn a thousand pesos a year".
2. "In the same district there will be a local court to impart justice".

The district changed its name to Amatitlán Department according to the executive order of 8 May 1866 of field Marshall Vicente Cerna y Cerna government.

=== Amatitlán Department dissolution and creation of the Amatitlán municipality ===
The Amatitlán Department was abolished by decree 2081 of 29 April 1935 of president general Jorge Ubico regime. This decree reads literally:

"Considering that it is convenient for the country's best interest that the Amatitlán Department be dissolved.
Decrees:

1. Amatitlán Department is abolished
2. Municipalities of Amatitlán, Villa Nueva, San Miguel Petapa and Villa Canales are incorporated into Guatemala Department and those of Palín and San Vicente Pacaya to the Escuintla Department.
3. The executive branch will issue the proper instructions to comply with this decree, which will be in effect on 1 July of this year".

Despite their movement in the 18th century to its present place, the religious relics of the Order of Preachers were taken from the original settlement, including the "Señor Sepultado" (The Buried Lord) sculpture, which is five centuries old.

== Traditions ==
San Miguel Petapa also has two main traditional holidays, one of which is celebrated in February and is appointed to Our Lady of the Rosary. Besides the solemn procession, there are praises appearances (popular religious theatrical plays). The other holiday is dedicated to Saint Michael (Archangel).

A tradition amongst Ladinos (mestizo people) in the municipality, is the Flowers Dance, which consists of a dance in which all contestants are rolling up, first, and unrolling later in a specific tree. Meanwhile music and recited verses are executed at the same time. This tradition was begun in the old Spanish capital, Santiago de Guatemala (the Antigua Guatemala of present-day) from where it was extended to the nearest villages. Years after, was taken to the new capital, Nueva Guatemala de la Asuncion. Today this folk dance is executed in other municipalities of the department of Guatemala, such as San Raymundo, Mixco, San Juan Sacatepequez, San Jose Pinula and Villa Nueva.

== Sports ==
Deportivo Petapa football club play in the second tier of Guatemalan football. Their home venue is the Estadio Julio Armando Cobar. Also, Deportivo Mixco have used the stadium while a new stadium of their own was built.

== Climate ==
San Miguel Petapa has tropical climate (Köppen: Aw).

Climate data for San Miguel Petapa
Month	Jan	Feb	Mar	Apr	May	Jun	Jul	Aug	Sep	Oct	Nov	Dec	Year
Mean daily maximum °C (°F)	26.1 (79.0)	27.0 (80.6)	28.4 (83.1)	28.6 (83.5)	28.3 (82.9)	26.6 (79.9)	26.8 (80.2)	26.8 (80.2)	26.1 (79.0)	26.1 (79.0)	25.6 (78.1)	25.7 (78.3)	26.8 (80.3)
Daily mean °C (°F)	20.2 (68.4)	20.7 (69.3)	21.9 (71.4)	22.6 (72.7)	22.7 (72.9)	21.9 (71.4)	22.0 (71.6)	21.8 (71.2)	21.5 (70.7)	21.3 (70.3)	20.4 (68.7)	20.1 (68.2)	21.4 (70.6)
Mean daily minimum °C (°F)	14.3 (57.7)	14.5 (58.1)	15.5 (59.9)	16.7 (62.1)	17.2 (63.0)	17.3 (63.1)	17.2 (63.0)	16.9 (62.4)	16.9 (62.4)	16.5 (61.7)	15.3 (59.5)	14.5 (58.1)	16.1 (60.9)
Average precipitation mm (inches)	1 (0.0)	2 (0.1)	3 (0.1)	24 (0.9)	120 (4.7)	248 (9.8)	214 (8.4)	182 (7.2)	229 (9.0)	126 (5.0)	16 (0.6)	4 (0.2)	1,169 (46)
Source: Climate-Data.org

== Geographic location ==
San Miguel Petapa is completely surrounded by Guatemala Department municipalities:

== See also ==
- List of places in Guatemala

== Notes and references ==
=== Bibliography ===
- Belaubre, Christopohe (2001). "Poder y redes sociales en Centroamérica: el caso de la Orden de los Dominicos (1757-1829)" (PDF). Mesoamérica (in Spanish). 41. Archived from the original (PDF) on 21 January 2015.
- Juarros, Domingo (1818). Compendio de la historia de la Ciudad de Guatemala (in Spanish). Guatemala: Ignacio Beteta.
- Municipalidad de Palín (2007). "Municipalidad de Palín - Historia". Municipalidad de Palín (in Spanish). Archived from the original on 9 December 2007.
- van Oss, Adriaan C. (1986). Catholic Colonialism: A Parish History of Guatemala, 1524-1821. Cambridge, UK: Cambridge University Press. ISBN 9780521527125.
