= Villa Nueva, Guatemala =

Villa Nueva Ciudad de Villa Nueva
- City
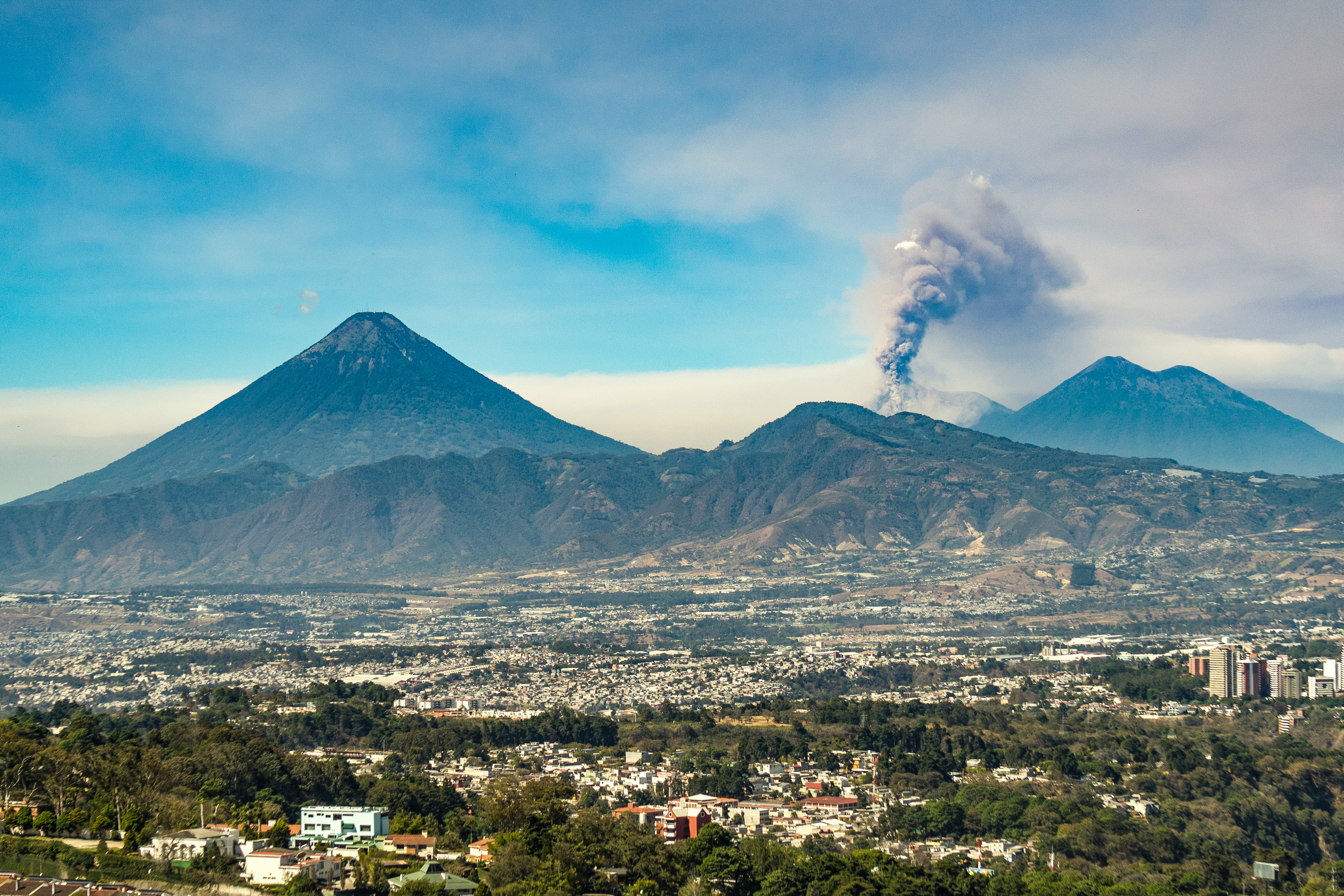
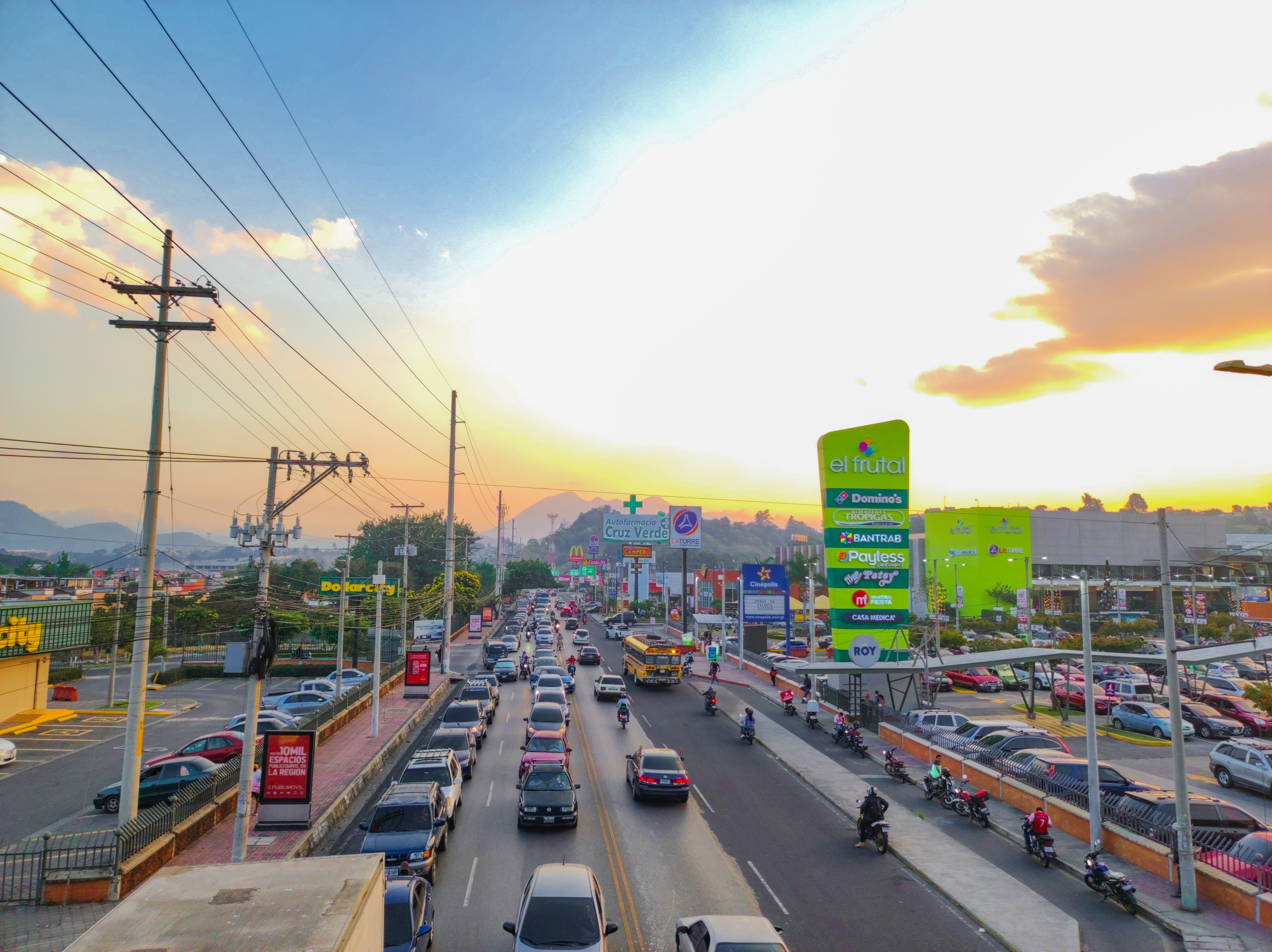
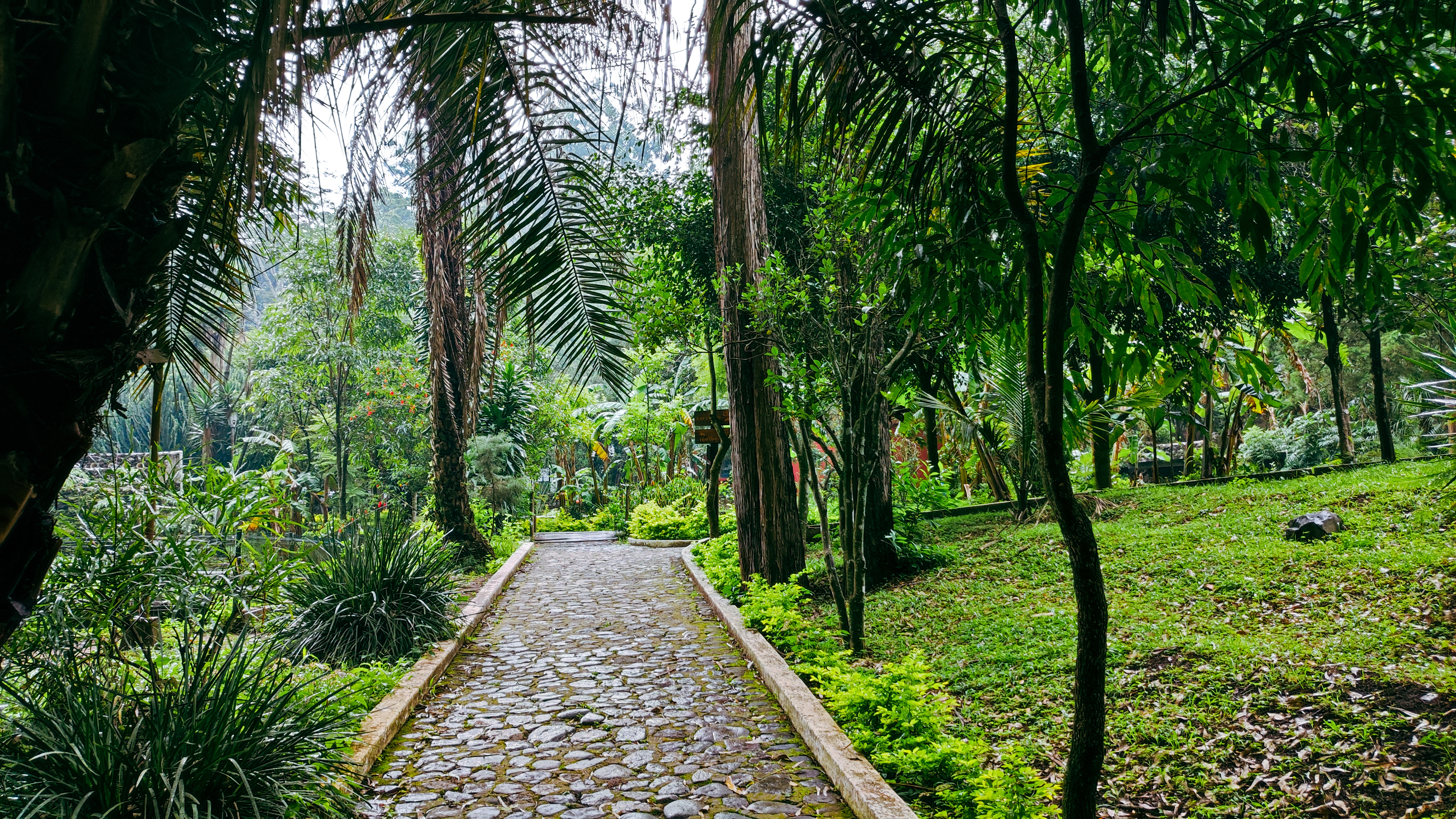
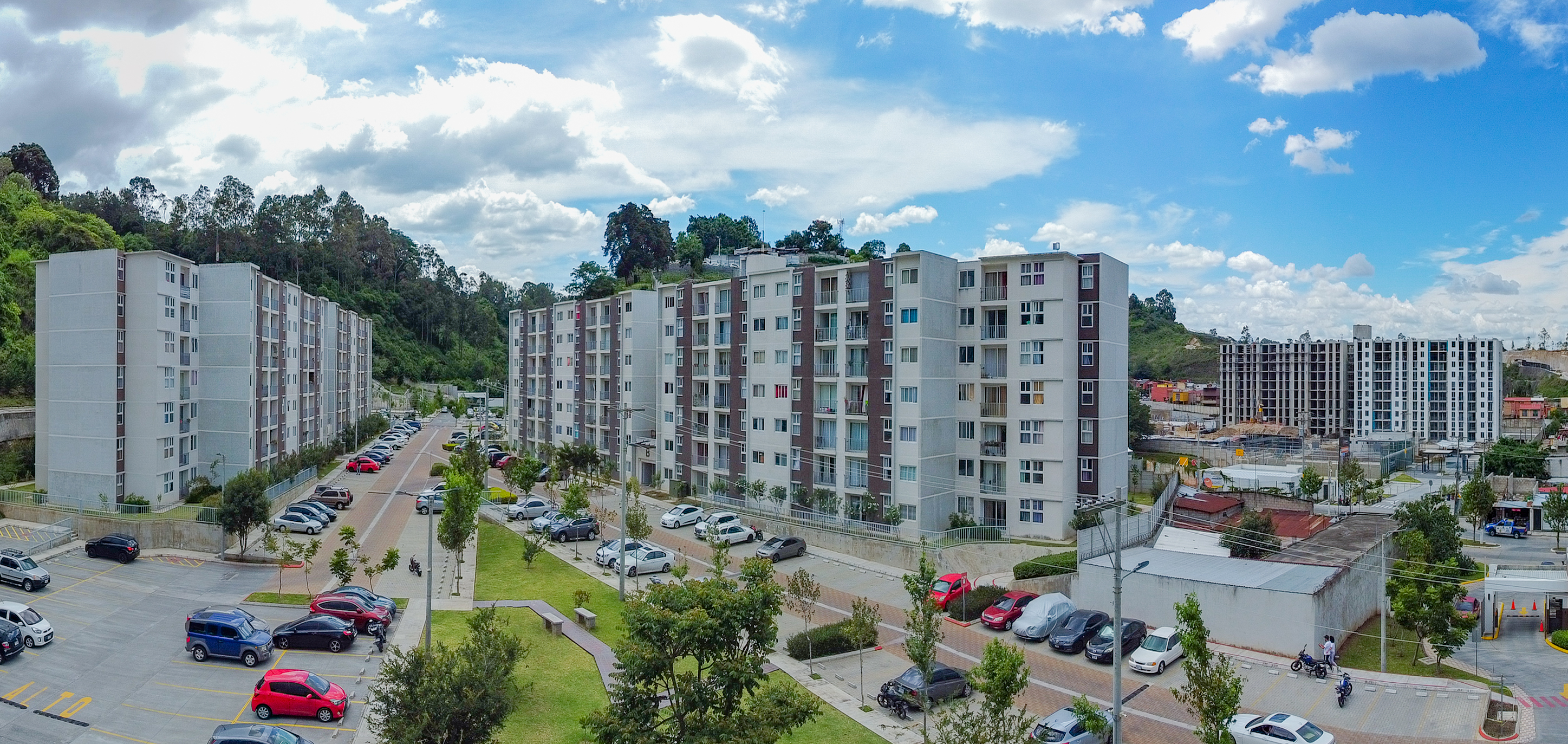
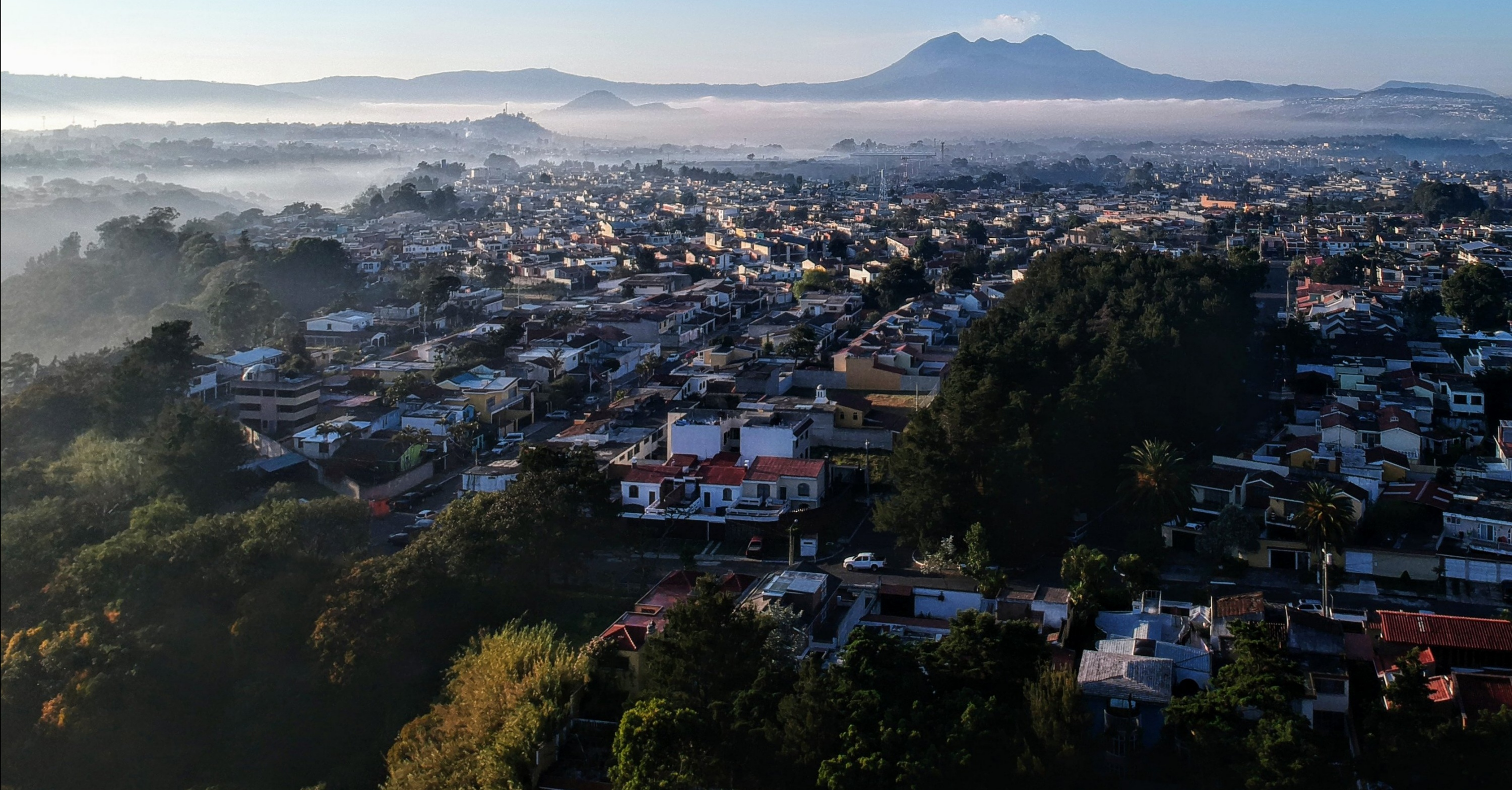
- From top, left to right: Panoramic view of the City of Villanueva and the important volcanoes • The Boulevard El Frutal • The United Nations Park • View of Entre Valles and Solana • Sunrise in the City of Villanueva

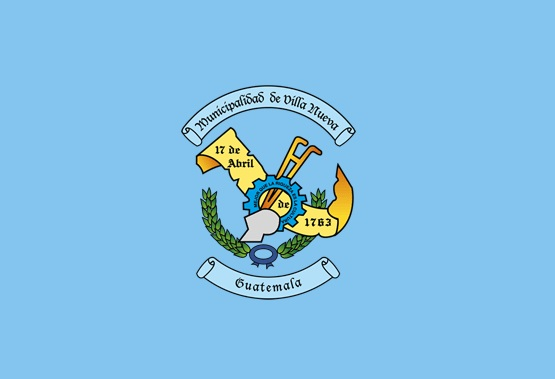
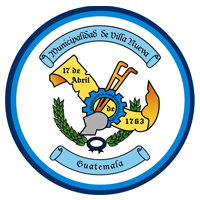
- Flag Seal
- Villa Nueva location
- Location in Guatemala Department Villa Nueva (Guatemala)
- Coordinates: 14°31′37″N 90°35′15″W
- Country: Guatemala
- Department: Guatemala
- Founded: 17 April 1763

Government
  - Mayor (2020–2024): Javier Gramajo

Area
  - Total: 114 km^{2} (44 sq mi)
- Elevation: 1,330 m (4,360 ft)

Population (2018)
  - Total: 433,734
  - Rank: 3rd in Guatemala; 6th in Central America
  - Density: 3,800/km^{2} (9,850/sq mi)
- Climate: Aw

Villa Nueva is a city in the Guatemala department of Guatemala. The city centre of Villa Nueva at Villa Nueva Central Park is located 16 kilometres (10 mi) south of Guatemala City. The city has a population of 618,397 (2018 census), making it the second largest in Guatemala Department, after Guatemala City. It was founded on 17 April 1763, long before Guatemala declared its independence from the Spanish Empire. The local economy largely depends on industry, with the municipality having some 100 factories that produce such products as textiles, metallurgical goods, and plastics. The area's agricultural products include rice, dairy, fruits, and vegetables.

Mayor Salvador Gándara, serving from 2000 to 2011, was longlisted for the 2008 World Mayor award; Sites of interest include the Naciones Unidas National Park, and several malls, including Metrocentro and Santa Clara.

== History ==
=== Amatitlán Department creation ===
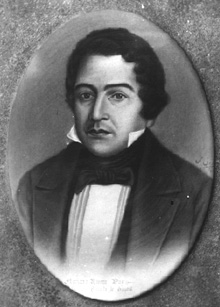
Portrait of Mariano Rivera Paz. Rivera Paz was governor of the State of Guatemala when he declared Amatitlán an independent district in 1839.

During governor Mariano Rivera Paz' time in office, a decree was issued on 6 November 1839 declaring Amatitlán and independent district, which also included Palín and Villa Nueva. The decree says:

1. "The city of Amatitlán, San Cristóbal Palín, Villa Nueva, San Miguel and Santa Inés Petapa and all the annexed locations to these settlements will form an independent district for its political government and will be under the charge of a Lieutenant Corregidor, who will act according to the applicable law starting on 2 October of this year and will earn a thousand pesos a year".
2. "In the same district there will be a local court to impart justice".

The district changed its name to Amatitlán Department according to the executive order of 8 May 1866 of field Marshall Vicente Cerna y Cerna government.

=== Amatitlán Department dissolution and creation of the Villa Nueva municipality ===
Amatitlán Department was abolished by decree 2081 of 29 April 1935 of president general Jorge Ubico regime. This decree literally reads:

"Considering that it is convenient for the country's best interest that the Amatitlán Department be dissolved.
Decrees:

1. Amatitlán Departament is abolished
2. Municipalities of Amatitlán, Villa Nueva, San Miguel Petapa and Villa Canales are incorporated into Guatemala Department and those of Palín and San Vicente Pacaya to the Escuintla Department.
3. The executive branch will issue the proper instructions to comply with this decree, which will be in effect on 1 July of this year".

== Climate ==
Villa Nueva has a tropical savanna climate (Köppen: Aw).

Climate data for Villa Nueva
Month	Jan	Feb	Mar	Apr	May	Jun	Jul	Aug	Sep	Oct	Nov	Dec	Year
Mean daily maximum °C (°F)	25.2 (77.4)	26.1 (79.0)	27.4 (81.3)	27.8 (82.0)	27.5 (81.5)	25.9 (78.6)	25.9 (78.6)	26.2 (79.2)	25.5 (77.9)	25.4 (77.7)	24.9 (76.8)	24.8 (76.6)	26.1 (78.9)
Daily mean °C (°F)	19.4 (66.9)	19.8 (67.6)	20.9 (69.6)	21.7 (71.1)	22.0 (71.6)	21.3 (70.3)	21.2 (70.2)	21.3 (70.3)	20.9 (69.6)	20.7 (69.3)	19.8 (67.6)	19.3 (66.7)	20.7 (69.2)
Mean daily minimum °C (°F)	13.6 (56.5)	13.6 (56.5)	14.5 (58.1)	15.7 (60.3)	16.6 (61.9)	16.8 (62.2)	16.6 (61.9)	16.4 (61.5)	16.4 (61.5)	16.0 (60.8)	14.8 (58.6)	13.8 (56.8)	15.4 (59.7)
Average precipitation mm (inches)	1 (0.0)	3 (0.1)	5 (0.2)	26 (1.0)	126 (5.0)	253 (10.0)	217 (8.5)	182 (7.2)	244 (9.6)	130 (5.1)	16 (0.6)	5 (0.2)	1,208 (47.5)
Source: Climate-Data.org

== Notable persons ==
=== Miss International ===
Ilma Urrutia, Miss International 1984

== See also ==
- List of places in Guatemala
- Guatemala Department
- Guatemala City

== Notes and references ==
=== Bibliography ===
- Municipalidad de Palín (2007). "Municipalidad de Palín - Historia". Municipalidad de Palín (in Spanish). Archived from the original on 9 December 2007.
