= Naciones Unidas National Park =

National park in Villa Nueva, Guatemala

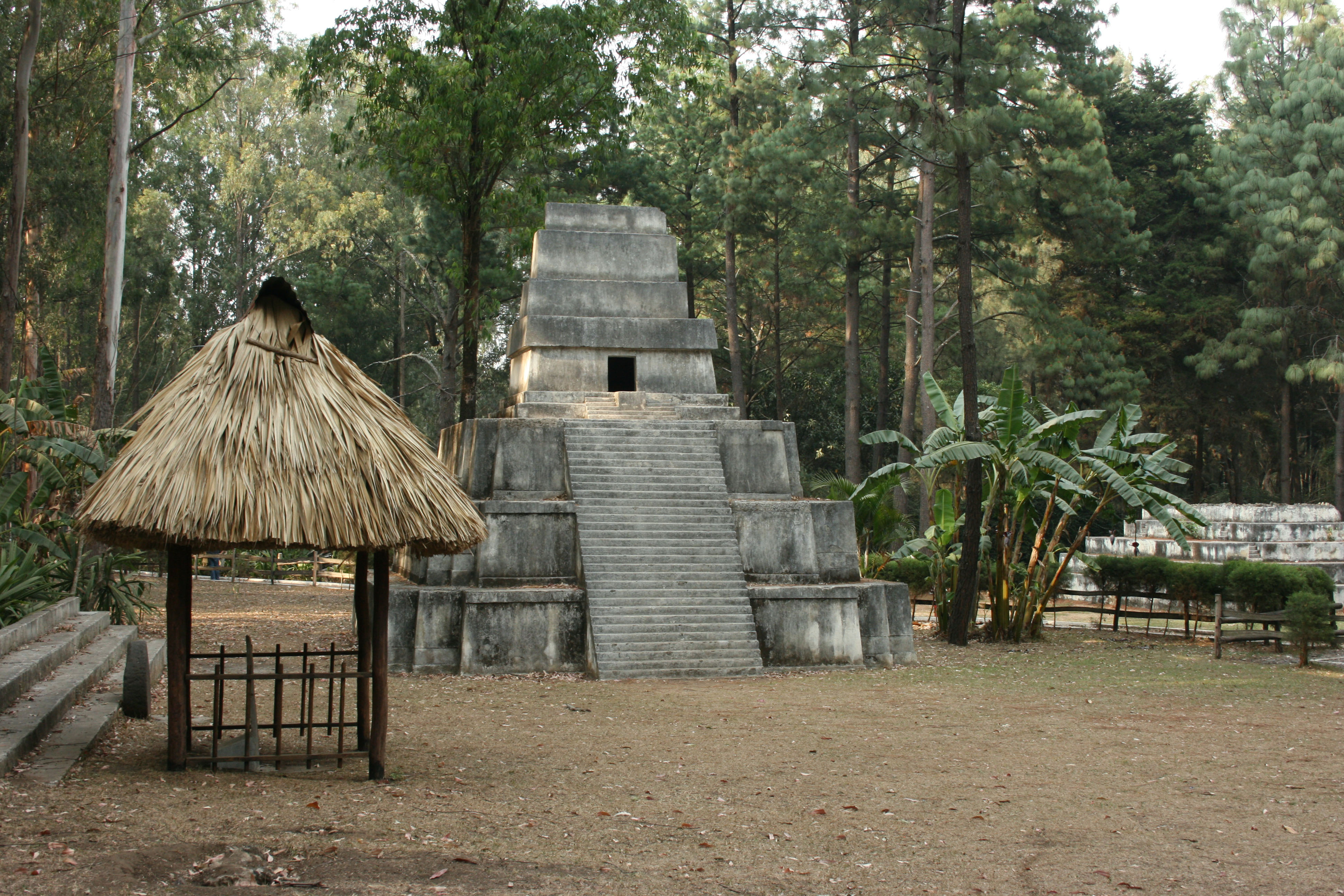

- Location within Guatemala
- Location: Guatemala (department), Guatemala
- Coordinates: 14°29′54″N 90°36′37″W
- Area: 4.91 km^{2} (1.90 sq mi)
- Elevation: 1,450 m (4,760 ft)
- Established: Acuerdo Gubernativo 26-05-55 & 319-97
- Operator: INAB/Defensores de la Naturaleza
- Website: https://defensores.org.gt/areas-protegidas/parque-nacional-naciones-unidas/

Naciones Unidas National Park is a forested park area of 4.91 km^{2}, located 21 km south of Guatemala City, just north of Lake Amatitlán in the municipality of Villa Nueva. It is one of the last remaining nature reserves in the Guatemala City Metropolitan Area.

== History ==
The United Nations National Park was declared a "National Park" by Presidential Agreement of May 26, 1955. It is one of the oldest National Parks in Guatemala. It was assigned as a usufruct for 25 years to Fundación Defensores de la Naturaleza according to agreement 319-97 of April 22, 1997. This agreement was modified by Agreement 42-2007 and later according to Agreement 124-2007, through these agreements Fundación Defensores de la Naturaleza has under its administration 2,497,160.5896 square meters.

== Features ==
The park is visited by many people due to its proximity to the city offering views of the Pacaya Volcano and Lake Amatitlán. This destination protects the forest in the area and provides spaces for family recreation. Trails, picnic areas, replicas of the temples of Tikal and the central park of Antigua Guatemala are some of the attractions of the place.

== Biology and Ecology ==
According to monitoring carried out in the park, the presence of at least 111 species of birds, 11 species of mammals, 36 species of reptiles and 5 species of amphibians has been confirmed.

The species of trees and vegetation that can be identified and that are under protection and monitoring by the park authorities are:

- Cypress (Cupressus lucitanica)
- Pine (Pinus oocarpa)
- Cedar (Cedrella tonduzi)
- Loquat (Eriobotrya japonica)
- Avocado (Persea americana)
- Guava (Psidion Guajava)
