= Mariano Rivera Paz =

Guatemalan statesman (1804–1849)

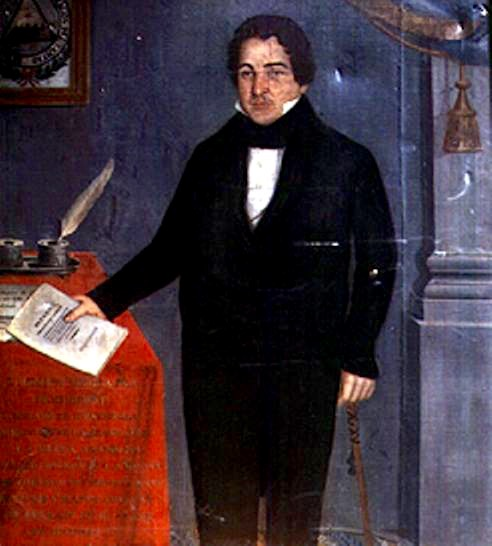

Head of State of Guatemala
- In office 14 May 1842 – 11 December 1844
- Preceded by: José Venancio López
- Succeeded by: Rafael Carrera (as President)
- In office 3 December 1839 – 25 February 1842
- Preceded by: himself as Chief of State
- Succeeded by: José Venancio López

Chief of State of Guatemala
- In office 13 April 1839 – 3 December 1839
- Preceded by: Carlos Salazar Castro
- Succeeded by: Himself as Head of State
- In office 29 July 1838 – 30 January 1839
- Preceded by: Pedro José Valenzuela y Jauregui
- Succeeded by: Carlos Salazar Castro

Personal details
- Born: 24 December 1804 Guatemala City
- Died: 26 February 1849 (aged 44) Jalapa, Guatemala
- Party: Liberal
- Education: Real y Pontificia Universidad de San Carlos Borromeo
- Profession: Lawyer, politician

Mariano Rivera Paz (24 December 1804 – 26 February 1849) was Head of State of Guatemala and its first president.

== Biography ==
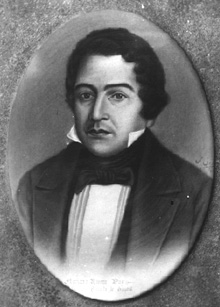
Portrait of Mariano Rivera Paz

Mariano Rivera Paz was born in Guatemala City and studied law in the Royal and Pontifical University of San Carlos Borromeo.

== Conflagration between Liberals and Conservatives ==
In 1838 the liberal forces of Morazan and José Francisco Barrundia invaded Guatemala and reached San Sur, where they executed Chúa Alvarez, father-in-law of the Guatemalan military leader Rafael Carrera and laid his head on a pike to teach a lesson to all followers of the Guatemalan caudillo. Upon learning this, Carrera and his wife Petrona - had come to confront Morazán as soon as they learned of the invasion and were in Mataquescuintla- swore they would never forgive Morazan even in his grave, as they felt that no one could respect someone who could not avenge family members. After sending several envoys, who Carrera would not receive -especially Barrundia who was not received because Carrera did not want to murder him in cold blood- Morazán began a strong scorched earth offensive, destroying villages in his path and stripping them of their few assets, thus forcing Carrera forces to hide in the mountains. Believing that Carrera was totally defeated, Morazán and Barrundia marched on to Guatemala City where they were welcomed as saviors by the state governor Pedro Valenzuela and members of the conservative Aycinena Clan, who even proposed to sponsor one of the liberal battalions, while Valenzuela and Barrundia gave Morazán all the Guatemalan resources needed to solve any financial problem he had. The criollos of both parties celebrated until dawn that they finally had a caudillo like Morazan, who was able to crush the peasant rebellion. Morazán used the proceeds to support Los Altos and then replaced Valenzuela by Rivera Paz, member of the Aycinena clan, although he did not return to that clan any property confiscated in 1829; in revenge, Juan José de Aycinena y Piñol voted for the dissolution of the Central American Federation in San Salvador a little later, thereby forcing Morazán to return to El Salvador to fight for his dying federal mandate. Along the way, Morazán increased repression in eastern Guatemala, as punishment for helping Carrera, whom he considered expired. Knowing that Morazán had gone to El Salvador, Carrera tried to take Salamá with the small force that remained, but was defeated, losing his brother Laureano in combat. With just a few men left, he managed to escape, badly wounded, to Sanarate. After recovering a little bit, attacked a detachment in Jutiapa and managed to get a little booty which he handed to the volunteers who accompanied him and prepared to attack Petapa, near Guatemala City, where he triumphed, but with heavy casualties. In September of that year, Carrera attempted an assault on the capital of Guatemala, but the liberal general Carlos Salazar Castro defeated him in the fields of Villa Nueva and Carrera had to retreat. After an unsuccessful attempt to take Quetzaltenango, Carrera was surrounded and wounded, and he had to capitulate to the Mexican General Agustin Guzman, who lay in Quetzaltenango since the time of Vicente Filísola arrival in 1823. Morazán had the opportunity to shoot him, but could not because he needed the support of the Guatemalan peasants to counter the attacks of Francisco Ferrera in El Salvador; instead, Morazán left Carrera in charge of a minute fort in Mita, and without any weapons. Knowing that Morazán was going to attack El Salvador, Francisco Ferrera gave a thousand arms and ammunition to Carrera and convinced him to attack Guatemala City.

Meanwhile, despite insistent advice to definitely crush Carrera and his forces, Salazar tried to negotiate with him diplomatically; he even went as far as to show that he neither feared nor distrusted Carrera by removing the fortifications that were in place in the Guatemalan capital since the battle of Villa Nueva. Taking advantage of Salazar's good faith and Ferrera's weapons, Carrera caught by surprise Guatemala City on April 13, 1839; at that moment, Castro Salazar, Mariano Gálvez and Barrundia fled before the arrival of Carrera militia men. Salazar, in his nightshirt, vaulted roofs of neighboring houses and sought refuge; then, as he could, he reached the border disguised as a peasant and fled Guatemala. With Salazar gone, Carrera reinstated Rivera Paz as Head of State of Guatemala

=== Invasion and absorption of Los Altos ===
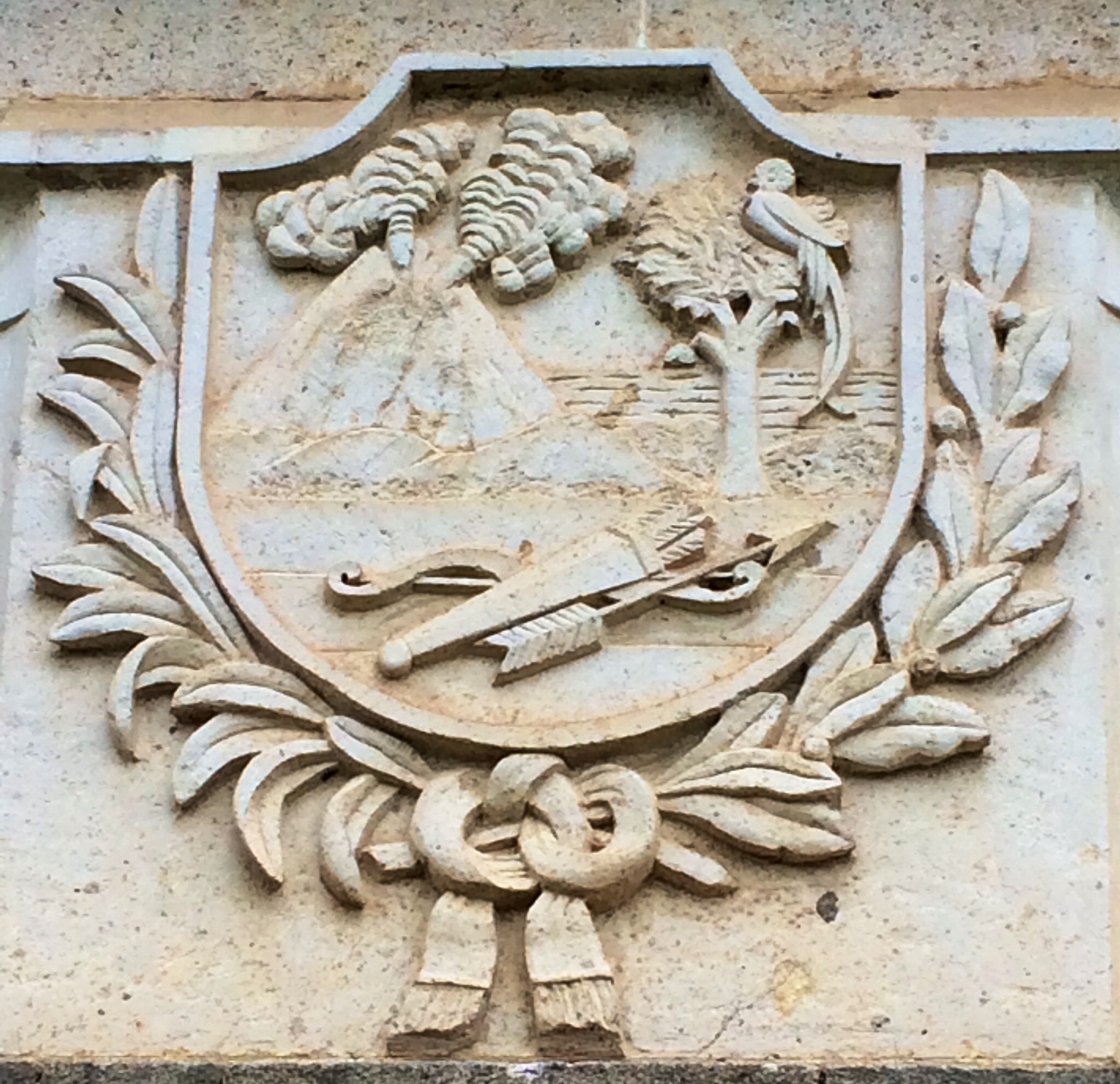
State Coat of Los Altos, carved in stone on the grave of heroes in the Cemetery of Quetzaltenango

On April 2, 1838, in the city of Quetzaltenango, a secessionist group founded the independent State of Los Altos which seeks independence from Guatemala. The most important members of the Liberal Party of Guatemala and liberal enemies of the conservative regime moved to Los Altos, who no longer had to emigrate to El Salvador, having a pro liberal state practically in his country agglutinated The liberals in Los Altos began harshly criticizing the Conservative government of Rivera Paz; even had their own newspaper -El Popular, which contributed to the harsh criticism. Moreover, there was that Los Altos was the region with more production and economic activity of the former State of Guatemala; without Los Altos, conservatives lost many merits that held the hegemony of the State of Guatemala in Central America. Then, the government of Guatemala tried to reach to a peaceful solution, but altenses, (Note: Altenses is how people from Quetzaltenango are known in Guatemala.) protected by the recognition of the Central American Federation Congress, did not accept; Guatemala's government then resorted to force, sending the commanding general of the Army Rafael Carrera subdue Los Altos.

Carrera defeated General Agustin Guzman when the former Mexican officer tried to ambush him and then went on to Quetzaltenango, where he imposed a harsh and hostile conservative regime for liberals. Calling all council members, he told them flatly that he was behaving kindly to them for being that the first time they had challenged him, but sternly warned them that there would be no mercy if there was a second time. Finally, the general Guzmán, and the head of state of Los Altos, Marcelo Molina, were sent to the capital of Guatemala, where they were displayed as trophies of war during a triumphant parade on February 17, 1840; in the case of Guzman, shackled, still with bleeding wounds, and riding a mule.

=== Second invasion and Morazán's defeat ===
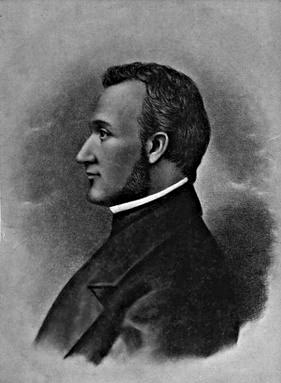
General Francisco Morazán tried to invade Guatemala for the second time in 1840 after having invaded in 1829 and expelled members of the Aycinena clan and regular orders. In 1840 he was defeated by Carrera overwhelmingly, marking the end of his career in Central America

On March 18, 1840, liberal caudillo Morazán invaded Guatemala with 1500 soldiers to avenge the insult done in Los Altos and fearing that such action would end with liberal efforts to hold together the Central American Federation. Guatemala had a cordon of guards from the border with El Salvador; without telegraph service, men ran carrying last minute messages. With the information from these messengers, Carrera hatched their plan of defense leaving his brother Sotero by troops who presented a slight resistance in the city. Carrera pretended to flee and led the ragtag army to the heights of Aceituno as only had about four men and the same number of loads rifle, plus two old cannons. The city was at the mercy of the army of Morazán, with bells of their twenty temples ringing for divine assistance. Once Morazán reached the capital, he took it easily and freed Guzman, who immediately left for Quetzaltenango to give the news that Carrera was defeated; Carrera then, taking advantage of what his enemies believed, applied a strategy of concentrating fire on the Central Park of the city and also employed surprise attack tactics with which caused heavy casualties to the army of Morazán to finally force the survivors to fight for their lives. (Note: In these battles participated the famous Guatemalan poet José Batres Montúfar) Now in such combat scenario, Morazán's soldiers lost the initiative and their numerical superiority. Furthermore, unaware of their surroundings in the city, Morazan's troops had to fight, carry their dead and care for their wounded while still resented being tired by the long march from El Salvador to Guatemala Carrera, by then an experienced military men (Note: Carrera even had suffered two previous defeats at the hands of Morazán.) was able to stand up and defeat Morazán thoroughly. The disaster for the liberal general was complete: aided by Angel Molina (Note: Angel Molina was the son of Guatemalan Liberal leader Pedro Molina Mazariegos.) who knew the streets of the city, had to flee with his favorite men, disguised shouting "Long live Carrera!" through ravine of El Incienso to El Salvador, to save his life. In his absence, Morazán had been relieved as Head of State of that country, which is why he had to embark for exile in Peru. In Guatemala, survivors from his troops were shot without mercy, while Carrera was out in pursuit of Morazan, who he failed to catch. This lance definitely sealed the status of General Carrera and marked the decline of Morazán., and forced the conservative Aycinena clan criollos to negotiate with Carrera and his peasant revolutionary supporters.

Agustin Guzmán, who was freed by Morazán when the latter had seemingly defeated Carrera in Guatemala City, had gone back to Quetzaltenango to tell the good news. The city liberal criollo leaders rapidly reinstated the Los Altos State and celebrated Morazán's victory. However, as soon as Carrera and the newly reinstated Rivera Paz heard the news, Carrera went back to Quetzaltenango with his voluntary army to regain control of the rebel liberal state once and for all. On 2 April 1840, after entering the city, Carrera told the citizens that he had already warned them after he defeated them earlier that year. Then, he ordered the majority of the liberal city hall officials from Los Altos to be shot on his orders. Carrera, then forcibly annexed Quetzaltenango and much of Los Altos back into conservative Guatemala. After the violent and bloody reinstatement of the State of Los Altos by Carrera in April 1840, Luis Batres Juarros -conservative member of the Aycinena Clan then secretary general of the Guatemalan government of recently reinstated Rivera Paz- obtained from the vicar Larrazabal authorization to dismantle the regionalist Church. Acting priests of Quetzaltenango -capital of the would-be-state of Los Altos, priest Urban Ugarte and his coadjutor, priest José Maria Aguilar, were removed from their parish and likewise the priests of the parishes of San Martin Jilotepeque and San Lucas Tolimán. Larrazabal ordered the priests Fernando Antonio Dávila, Mariano Navarrete and Jose Ignacio Iturrioz to cover the parishes of Quetzaltenango, San Martin Jilotepeque and San Lucas Toliman, respectively.

The liberal criollos defeat and execution in Quetzaltenango reinforced Carrera ally status within the native population of the area, whom he respected and protected.

== Presidency ==
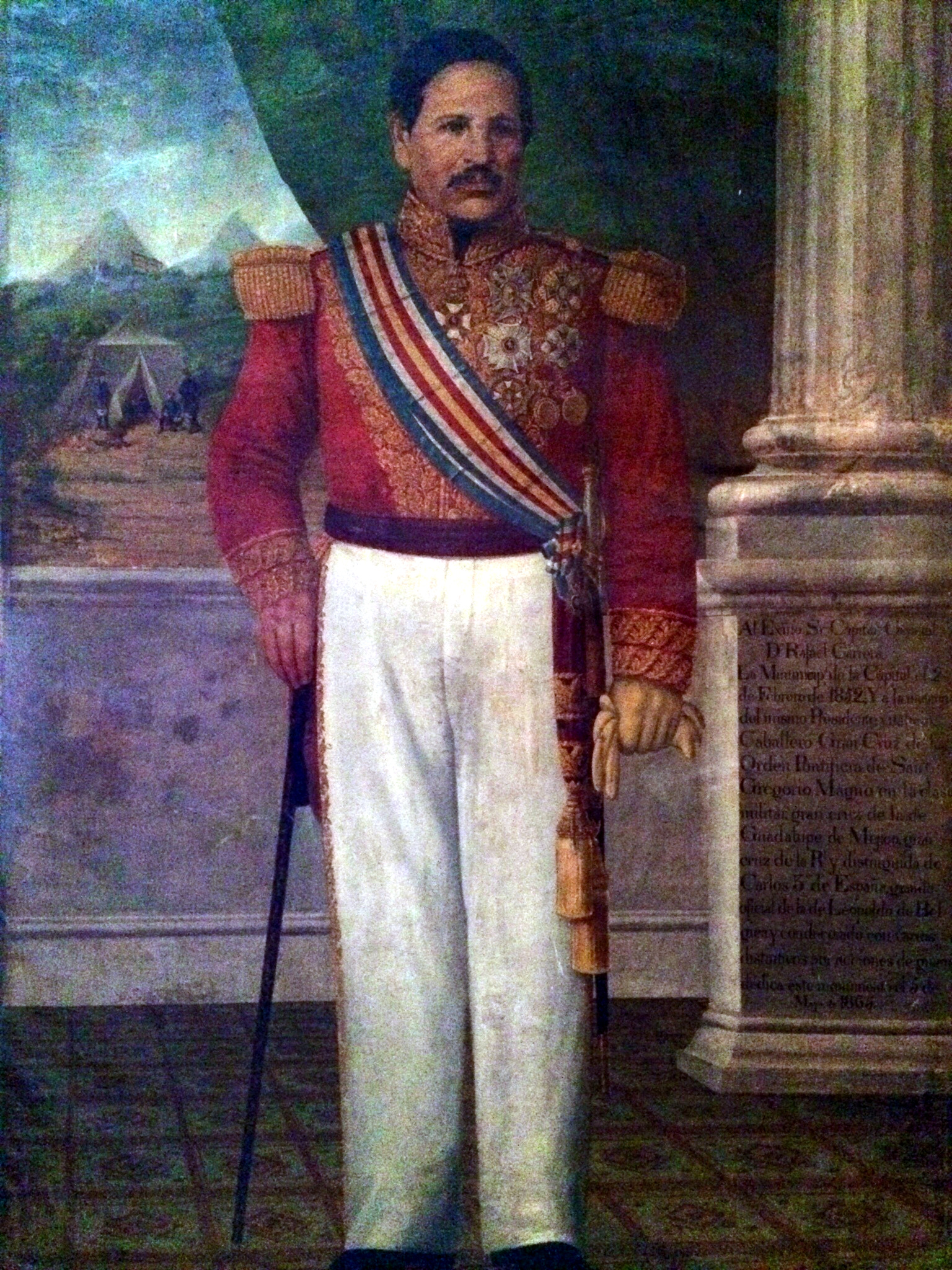
Captain General Rafael Carrera after being appointed President for Life of the Republic of Guatemala in 1854.

His term of office was in a time of great political turmoil for Guatemala, but he kept general Rafael Carrera by his side to help him. (Note: Rafael Carrera was to become the next president of Guatemala) When hostilities started with El Salvador in June 1844, Rivera Paz closed the borders to prevent an invasion using inmates of the state border for these the watch over. In December 1844, Rivera Paz presented his irrevocable resignation to the Assembly due to the pressure and demands from Rafael Carrera.

=== Belgium's colonization attempt ===
In 1840, Belgium began to act as an external source of support for his independence movement, in an effort to exert influence in Central America. The Compagnie belge de colonisation (Belgian Colonization Company), commissioned by Belgian King Leopold I, became the administrator of Santo Tomas de Castilla for a time, replacing the failed British Eastern Coast of Central America Commercial and Agricultural Company.

== Death ==
In eastern Guatemala, the Jalapa region became increasingly dangerous; rebel leader Vicente Cruz was murdered there after trying to take over the Corregidor office in 1849. On February 26, 1849, when Rivera Paz went to take possession of the provincial government of Jalapa, he was killed by the "Lucios" Roberto Reyes and Agustín Pérez in Sampaquisoy, Jalapa.

== See also ==
- Francisco Morazán
- Los Altos, Central America
- Presidents of Guatemala
- Rafael Carrera

== Bibliography ==
- Compagnie Belge de Colonisation (1844). "Colonisation du district de Santo-Thomas de Guatemala par la Communauté de l'Union". Collection de renseignements publiés ou recueillis par la Compagnie (in French). Original held and digitised by the British Library.
- Faubert, Denis; Soldevila, Carlos (2000). Guatemala. Ulysses Travel Publications. pp. 21–. ISBN 9782894641750.
- González Davison, Fernando (2008). La montaña infinita; Carrera, caudillo de Guatemala (in Spanish). Guatemala: Artemis y Edinter. ISBN 978-84-89452-81-7.
- Hernández de León, Federico (1959). "El capítulo de las efemérides: José Milla y Rafael Carrera". Diario la Hora (in Spanish). Guatemala.
- Hernández de León, Federico (1930). El libro de las efemérides (in Spanish). Vol. Tomo III. Guatemala: Tipografía Sánchez y de Guise.
- Marroquín Rojas, Clemente (1971). Francisco Morazán y Rafael Carrera (in Spanish). Editorial "José de Pineda Ibarra".
- Martínez Peláez, Severo (1988). Racismo y Análisis Histórico de la Definición del Indio Guatemalteco (in Spanish). Guatemala: Universitaria.
- Martínez Peláez, Severo (1990). La patria del criollo; ensayo de interpretación de la realidad colonial guatemalteca (in Spanish). México: Ediciones en Marcha.
- Montúfar, Lorenzo; Salazar, Ramón A. (1892). El centenario del general Francisco Morazán (in Spanish). Guatemala: Tipografía Nacional.
- Rosa, Ramón (1974). Historia del Benemérito Gral. Don Francisco Morazán, ex Presidente de la República de Centroamérica (in Spanish). Tegucigalpa: Ministerio de Educación Pública, Ediciones Técnicas Centroamericana.
- Stephens, John Lloyd; Catherwood, Frederick (1854). Incidents of travel in Central America, Chiapas, and Yucatan. London, England: Arthur Hall, Virtue and Co.
- Sullivan-González, Douglass (2008-08-18). Piety, Power, and Politics: Religion and Nation Formation in Guatemala, 1821-1871. University of Pittsburgh Pre. ISBN 9780822970507.
- Taracena, Arturo (1999). Invención criolla, sueño ladino, pesadilla indigena, Los Altos de Guatemala: de región a Estado, 1740-1871 (in Spanish). Guatemala: CIRMA. Archived from the original on 2016-01-09.
- Weaver, Frederic S. (March 1999). "Reform and (Counter) Revolution in Post-Independence Guatemala: Liberalism, Conservatism, and Postmodern Controversies". Latin American Perspectives. 26 (2): 129–158. doi:10.1177/0094582X9902600207. S2CID 143757705.
- Woodward, Ralph Lee (1993). Rafael Carrera and the Emergence of the Republic of Guatemala, 1821-1871. Athens, GA: University of Georgia Press. ISBN 9780820343600.

== Notes ==
Political offices
Preceded by Pedro Valenzuela	Head of State of Guatemala; July 27, 1838 - January 30, 1839	Succeeded by Carlos Salazar Castro
Preceded by Carlos Salazar Castro	Governor of Guatemala; April 13, 1839 - December 3, 1839	Succeeded by Rafael Carrera
Preceded by José Venancio López	Head of State of Guatemala; May 14, 1842 - December 11, 1844	Succeeded by Rafael Carrera
