= Villa Canales =

- Municipality
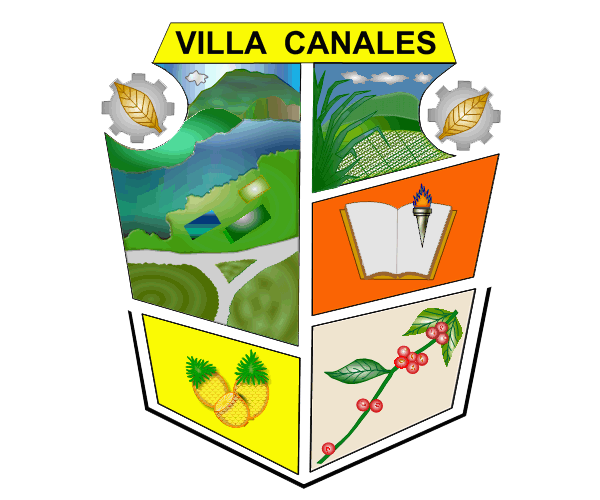
- Seal

- Location in Guatemala
- Coordinates: 14°29′0″N 90°32′0″W
- Country: Guatemala
- Department: Guatemala

Government
  - Mayor: Ramiro Rivera

Area
  - Municipality: 114 sq mi (295 km^{2})

Population (2018 census)
  - Municipality: 155,423
  - Density: 1,360/sq mi (527/km^{2})
  - Urban: 124,680
- Climate: Subtropical

Villa Canales is a city and municipality in the Guatemala department of Guatemala, situated 22 km south of the capital Guatemala City. As of the 2018 census, the city had a population of 124,680, making it the eleventh largest city in Guatemala.

== Economy ==
The economy of Villa Canales is based around coffee, sugarcane, and pineapple. The city is the largest producer of pineapple in the nation, due to the nearby Pacaya Volcano which fertilizes the soil. Due to rapid growth and development, it has become one of the main municipalities of the department.

== History ==
=== Spanish colony: Doctrine of Order of Preachers ===
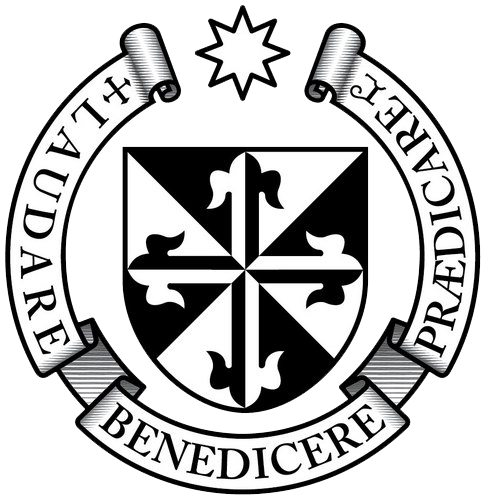
Order of Preachers coat of arms.

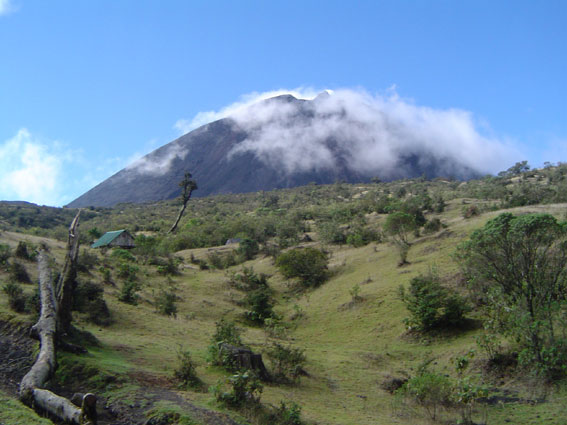
The Pacaya Volcano, responsible for much of the agriculture of Villa Canales

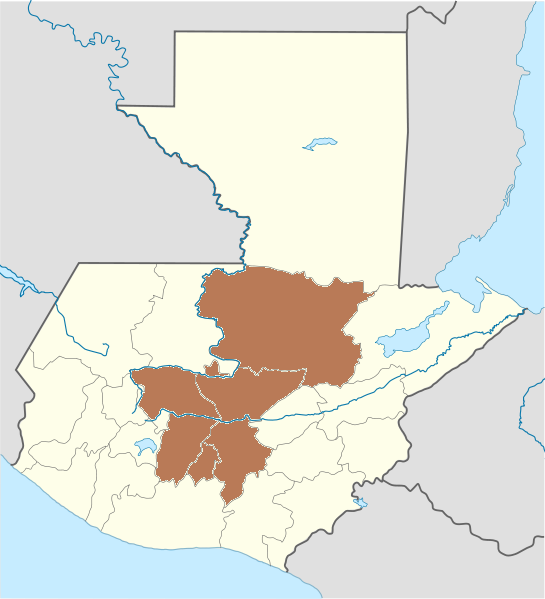
Order of Preachers convent during Guatemala Spanish colony and their approximate areas

After the conquest, the Spanish crown focused on the Catholic indoctrination of the natives. Human settlements founded by royal missionaries in the New World were called "Indian doctrines" or simply "doctrines". Originally, friars had only temporary missions: teach the Catholic faith to the natives, and then transfer the settlements to secular parishes, just like the ones that existed in Spain at the time; the friars were supposed to teach Spanish and Catholicism to the natives. And when the natives were ready, they could start living in parishes and contribute with mandatory tithing, just like the people in Spain.

But this plan never materialized, mainly because the Spanish crown lost control of the regular orders as soon as their friars set course to America. Shielded by their apostolic privileges granted to convert natives into Catholicism, the missionaries only responded to their order local authorities, and never to that of the Spanish government or the secular bishops. The orders local authorities, in turn, only dealt with their own order and not with the Spanish crown. Once a doctrine had been established, the protected their own economic interests, even against those of the King and thus, the doctrines became Indian towns that remains unaltered for the rest of the Spanish colony.

The doctrines were founded at the friars discretion, given that they were completely at liberty to settle communities provided the main purpose was to eventually transfer it as a secular parish which would be tithing of the bishop. In reality, what happened was that the doctrines grew uncontrollably and were never transferred to any secular parish; they formed around the place where the friars had their monastery and from there, they would go out to preach to settlements that belong to the doctrine and were called "annexes", "visits" or "visit towns". Therefore, the doctrines had three main characteristics:

1. they were independent from external controls (both ecclesiastical and civilian)
2. were run by a group of friars
3. had a relatively larger number of annexes.

The main characteristic of the doctrines was that they were run by a group of friars, because it made sure that the community system would continue without any issue when one of the members died.

In 1638, the Order of Preachers split their large doctrines —which meant large economic benefits for them— in groups centered around each one of their six monasteries, and the Pueblo Viejo doctrine was moved under the Amatitlán monastery jurisdiction:

Order of Preachers doctrines in colonial Guatemala
Monastery	Doctrines
Amatitlán	Amatitlán; Mixco; Petapa; San Cristóbal Palín

=== After independence: Amatitlán Department ===
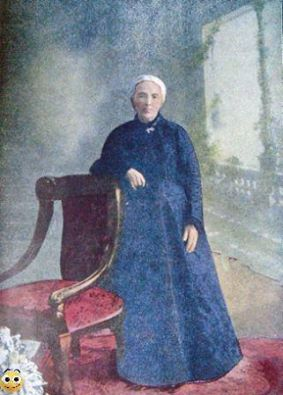
Joaquina Cabrera, president Manuel Estrada Cabrera's mother. «San Joaquín Villa Canales» was a name given to this municipality in 1915, in her honor.

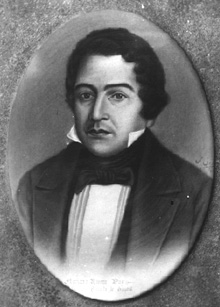
Portrait of Mariano Rivera Paz. Rivera Paz was governor of the State of Guatemala when he created Amatitlán as an independent district in 1839.

After the independence of Central America, and during governor Mariano Rivera Paz time in office, a decree issue on 6 November 1839, created a new independent district called Amatitlán which also included Palín and Villa Nueva. The decree reads:

1. "The city of Amatitlán, San Cristóbal Palín, Villa Nueva, San Miguel and Santa Inés Petapa and all the annexed locations to these settlements will form an independent district for its political government and will be in charge of a Lieutenant Corregidor, who will act according to the applicable law starting on 2 October of this year and will earn a thousand pesos a year".
2. "In the same district there will be a local court to impart justice".

The district changed its name to Amatitlán Department according to the executive order of 8 May 1866 of field Marshall Vicente Cerna y Cerna government.

On 3 June 1912 Pueblo Viejo became a new municipality within the Amatitlán Department and on 21 August 1915, the municipal council met with then president, Manuel Estrada Cabrera, to officially change the name of the municipality to San Joaquín Villa Canales, in honor of the late president's mother, Joaquina Cabrera, who died in 1908 but that the president admirers continued honoring unconditionally. Furthermore "San Joaquin", did not exist in the list of names approved the Catholic Church.

It was until after Estrada Cabrera was sent to prison following the Tragic Week of 1920 that the new president Carlos Herrera y Luna, issued an executive action on 3 May 1920 asking for all the names related to the former dictator and his family to be removed from any location named after them. Thus, the municipality became simply «Villa Canales».

The Amatitlán Department was abolished by decree 2081 of 29 April 1935 of president general Jorge Ubico regime. This decree literally reads:

"Considering that it is convenient for the country's best interest that the Amatitlán Department be dissolved.
Decrees:

1. Amatitlán Departament is abolished
2. Municipalities of Amatitlán, Villa Nueva, San Miguel Petapa and Villa Canales are incorporated into Guatemala Department and those of Palín and San Vicente Pacaya to the Escuintla Department.
3. The executive branch will issue the proper instructions to comply with this decree, which will be in effect on 1 July of this year".

== Climate ==
Villa Canales has a subtropical climate characterized by a rainy season extending from mid-May to late October and a prolonged dry season lasting from late October to mid-May. During the dry season, precipitation is very scarce, with sunny days and cool nights prevailing. However, cold fronts from the north may occasionally move into the region, causing temperature drops, particularly between November and March. Due to its inland location and the mountainous terrain surrounding the area, Villa Canales has a considerably drier rainfall regime than the lowland regions of Guatemala's Pacific and Caribbean coasts.

During the rainy season, precipitation typically intensifies in June, decreases significantly during the midsummer drought (canícula) in July and August, and increases again in September. In October, rainfall tends to become less frequent as the transition to the dry season begins. Regarding temperature conditions, the mean annual temperature is approximately 21.3 °C, with average maximum temperatures reaching their highest values between March and May, particularly in April, when they hover around 28.5 °C. Average minimum temperatures are generally lower between December and February, with values close to 14 °C. The absolute maximum recorded temperature reached 35.5 °C, while the absolute minimum was 8 °C.

Climate data for Villa Canales
Month	Jan	Feb	Mar	Apr	May	Jun	Jul	Aug	Sep	Oct	Nov	Dec	Year
Record high °C (°F)	31.5 (88.7)	33.5 (92.3)	34.2 (93.6)	35.5 (95.9)	35.0 (95.0)	32.5 (90.5)	31.0 (87.8)	31.8 (89.2)	30.5 (86.9)	29.8 (85.6)	31.0 (87.8)	30.2 (86.4)	35.5 (95.9)
Mean daily maximum °C (°F)	25.8 (78.4)	27.0 (80.6)	28.2 (82.8)	28.5 (83.3)	28.2 (82.8)	26.4 (79.5)	26.6 (79.9)	26.6 (79.9)	26.0 (78.8)	26.0 (78.8)	25.4 (77.7)	25.4 (77.7)	26.7 (80.0)
Daily mean °C (°F)	19.9 (67.8)	20.7 (69.3)	21.7 (71.1)	22.5 (72.5)	22.6 (72.7)	21.7 (71.1)	21.8 (71.2)	21.6 (70.9)	21.4 (70.5)	21.2 (70.2)	20.3 (68.5)	19.9 (67.8)	21.3 (70.3)
Mean daily minimum °C (°F)	14.1 (57.4)	14.4 (57.9)	15.3 (59.5)	16.5 (61.7)	17.1 (62.8)	17.1 (62.8)	17.1 (62.8)	16.7 (62.1)	16.8 (62.2)	16.4 (61.5)	15.2 (59.4)	14.4 (57.9)	15.9 (60.7)
Record low °C (°F)	8.0 (46.4)	9.5 (49.1)	10.2 (50.4)	11.0 (51.8)	14.0 (57.2)	13.0 (55.4)	13.8 (56.8)	15.0 (59.0)	14.5 (58.1)	13.0 (55.4)	11.2 (52.2)	9.5 (49.1)	8.0 (46.4)
Average precipitation mm (inches)	1 (0.0)	2 (0.1)	4 (0.2)	26 (1.0)	69 (2.7)	144 (5.7)	62 (2.4)	63 (2.5)	119 (4.7)	94 (3.7)	20 (0.8)	5 (0.2)	609 (24)
Average precipitation days	0	0	0	2	7	15	7	7	15	9	2	0	64
Mean monthly sunshine hours	282.2	276.9	306.4	293.5	258.6	229.4	277.2	269.1	230.2	239.7	259.3	280.7	3,203.2
Source: Meteoblue.com

== Geographic location ==
Villa Canales is completely surrounded by municipalities of Guatemala Department, except on the South, where it borders Palín, an Escuintla Department municipality:

== Politics ==
- Front of Canalenan Unity

== See also ==
- List of places in Guatemala
- Guatemala City

== Notes and references ==
=== Bibliography ===
- Arévalo Martínez, Rafael (1945). ¡Ecce Pericles! (in Spanish). Guatemala: Tipografía Nacional.
- Belaubre, Christopohe (2001). "Poder y redes sociales en Centroamérica: el caso de la Orden de los Dominicos (1757-1829)" (PDF). Mesoamérica (in Spanish). 41. Archived from the original (PDF) on 21 January 2015.
- Fuentes y Guzmán, Francisco Antonio de (1883) [1690]. Zaragoza, Justo; Navarro, Luis (eds.). Recordación Florida. Discurso historial y demostración natural, material, militar y política del Reyno de Guatemala (in Spanish). Vol. II. Madrid, Spain: Central.
- Juarros, Domingo (1818). Compendio de la historia de la Ciudad de Guatemala (in Spanish). Guatemala: Ignacio Beteta.
- Municipalidad de Palín (2007). "Municipalidad de Palín - Historia". Municipalidad de Palín (in Spanish). Archived from the original on 9 December 2007.
- van Oss, Adriaan C. (1986). Catholic Colonialism: A Parish History of Guatemala, 1524-1821. Cambridge, UK: Cambridge University Press. ISBN 9780521527125.
- Villalobos Viato, Roberto (22 November 2014). "Sitios con nombres de líderes". D Fondo (in Spanish). Guatemala: Prensa Libre.
