= Celia Barrios de Reyna =

1st Mother Of Guatemala (1834–1897)

Celia Barrios y Mazariegos de Reina
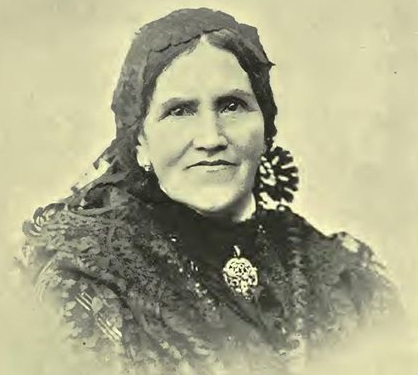

First Mother of the Nation Title of honor
- In office 12 March 1892 – 6 July 1897
- President: José María Reina Barrios
- Preceded by: Office established
- Succeeded by: Joaquina Cabrera

Personal details
- Born: 1 January 1834 San Marcos Department, Guatemala
- Died: 5 July 1897 (aged 63) Guatemala City, Guatemala

Celia Barrios Mazariegos de Reina (1 January 1834 - 5 July 1897) was the mother of President José María Reina Barrios and the 1st First Mother of Guatemala, and the sister of President Justo Rufino Barrios.

Celia Barrios y Mazariegos was born in San Marcos in 1834, daughter of Simon Barrios and Antolina Mazariegos, and married Joaquín Reyna, in 1850. They were the parents of José María, Manuel, María and María Antonia.

When her son General José María Reina Barrios reached the presidency on 12 March 1892, Mrs. Barrios was proclaimed "First Mother of the Nation", being the first country in which this term was used and being his only successor Mrs. Joaquina Cabrera, mother of the lawyer Manuel Estrada Cabrera.

She died on July 5, 1897, while she was sleeping. Three days of national mourning were declared, the national flag waved at half mast; she was buried in San Marcos.
