= José María Reina Barrios =

President of Guatemala from 1892 to 1898

General of Division José María Reina Barrios
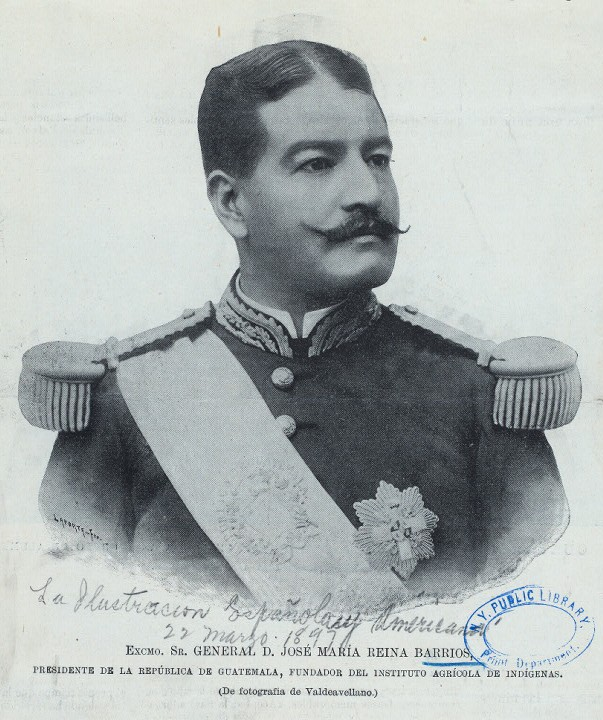

15th President of Guatemala
- In office 15 March 1892 – 8 February 1898
- Preceded by: Manuel Lisandro Barillas Bercián
- Succeeded by: Manuel Estrada Cabrera

Personal details
- Born: José María de Jesús Reyna Barrios; 24 December 1854 San Marcos, Guatemala
- Died: 8 February 1898 (aged 43) Guatemala City, Guatemala
- Cause of death: Assassination (gunshot wounds)
- Party: Liberal
- Spouse: Algeria Benton
- Children: He did not have any children with Argelia Benton; but he did have five children out of wedlock, among them Joaquín and José. (Note: Castellanos (2007). "José María Reina Barrios" (in Spanish). Guatemala. "Consuelo Reina Barrios was indeed daughter of Mrs. Argelia Benton a carried the Reina Barrios last name; however, in reality, she was the daughter of general Salvador Toledo, Reina Barrios Chief of Staff.")
- Parent(s): Joaquín Reina (Note: La Ilustración Guatemalteca (1897). "Doña Celia Barrios de Reina" (in Spanish). 1 (21). Guatemala. "Celia Barrios was Justo Rufino Barrios' sister."); Celia Barrios de Reyna
- Education: Escuela Politécnica
- Occupation: Military
- Nickname(s): "Reinita" "Don Chemita" "Tachuela" "Man of the tragic eights" (Note: Gaitán, Héctor (1982). La calle donde tú vives (in Spanish). Guatemala. "He was call "Man of the tragic eights" since he was murdered at 8 pm on February 8, 1898.")

José María de Jesús Reyna Barrios (24 December 1854 – 8 February 1898) was President of Guatemala from 15 March 1892, until his assassination on 8 February 1898.

He was a moderate of Guatemala's Liberal Party, who worked to solidify the less controversial of the reforms of late president Justo Rufino Barrios.

== Early life ==
José María de Jesús Reyna Barrios was born in San Marcos, Guatemala, and was nicknamed Reynita, the diminutive form, because of his short stature. He is the son of Celia Barrios de Reyna and Joaquín Reyna. He had three siblings, Manuel, María and María Antonia. His uncle was Justo Rufino Barrios and his cousins were Venancio Barrios, and Antonio Barrios Reyna.

== Political life ==
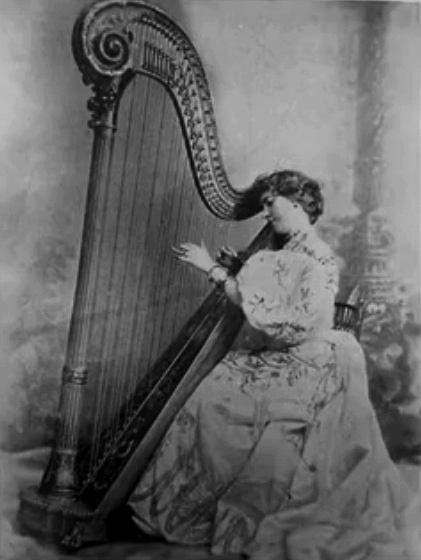
Algeria Benton, American wife of Reyna Barrios, playing the harp. Benton married Reyna Barrios on 17 May 1886, in the Guatemalan consulate in New York.

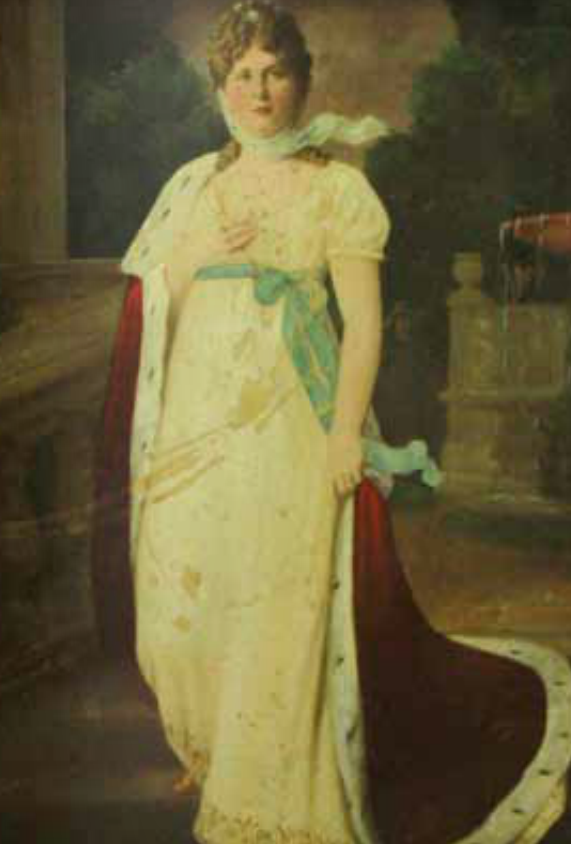
Algeria Benton de Reyna Barrios official portrait. Mrs. Benton de Reyna Barrios had a cold and distant relationship with her husband by the time he was killed.

Reyna Barrios was nephew of Justo Rufino Barrios, and as such he started his political career while his uncle was still President of Guatemala. After Barrios sudden death in Chalchuapa, El Salvador on 2 April. 1885, Reyna Barrios increased his political activity under the government of Manuel Lisandro Barillas, who was jealous of his popularity and sent him to Europe under false pretenses that there was a diplomatic appointment for him. The appointment never materialized and Reina Barrios was stuck in Europe and then in the United States for a few years.

=== 1892 presidential elections ===
Reyna Barrios finally made it back to Guatemala, in time to run for office in the 1892 presidential elections. It was the first election in Guatemala that allowed the candidates to advertise in the local newspapers. The candidates who ran for office were:

Name	Party	Supported by:	Other information
Lorenzo Montúfar	Liberal	Liberal Club	He was the only one of all candidates who made an engraving of his portrait to publish it in the newspapers and was accused of wasting resources for doing this.
Francisco Lainfiesta	Liberal	None	Published his government proposal in the Diario de Centro America, taking advantage of the freedom of the Press that existed during Barillas' government.
José María Reyna Barrios	Liberal	Liberal Club	Eventual winner.
Miguel Enríquez	Conservative	Conservative Party	Enríquez had been a liberal, but became a conservative after the persecution that he suffered from the Barillas administration. (Note: Castellanos (2014). "José María Reina Barrios". Guatemala. "In fact, after the elections Miguel Enríquez had to run away from his farm in Salama after being accused of sedition; he was captured and executed near Zacapa.")
José Carranza Llerena	Conservative	None	Medical Staff of President Barillas.

Barillas Bercian was unique among all liberal presidents of Guatemala between 1871 and 1944: he handed over power to his successor peacefully. When election time approached, he sent for the three Liberal candidates to ask them what their government plan would be. The following anecdote recounts better what happened then:

First arrived lawyer Francisco Lainfiesta, and General Barillas, with the friendliest of smiles, said: "Mr. Lainfiesta: you are one of the candidates in the upcoming elections and perhaps the more likely to win. Therefore, I would like to know what your attitude and your political system of government will be, if you get to win. Especially, I would like to know your attitude about my person; because I have made my mistakes, I do not deny it. I was a simple worker at my carpentry when General Justo Rufino Barrios sent for me to be appointed second presidential designate. I would therefore, Mr. Lainfiesta, know what conduct you will observe towards me." Mr. Lainfiesta said: "General Barillas: if luck would favor me with the election victory, my government will be based on strict adherence to the Constitution; the law would be the law and anyone who has acquired some responsibility, will have to answer for it before the relevant courts. A firm and righteous compliance with the constitutional provisions shall be the standard of my conduct as president". "Very well" said general Barillas, and both parted cordially.

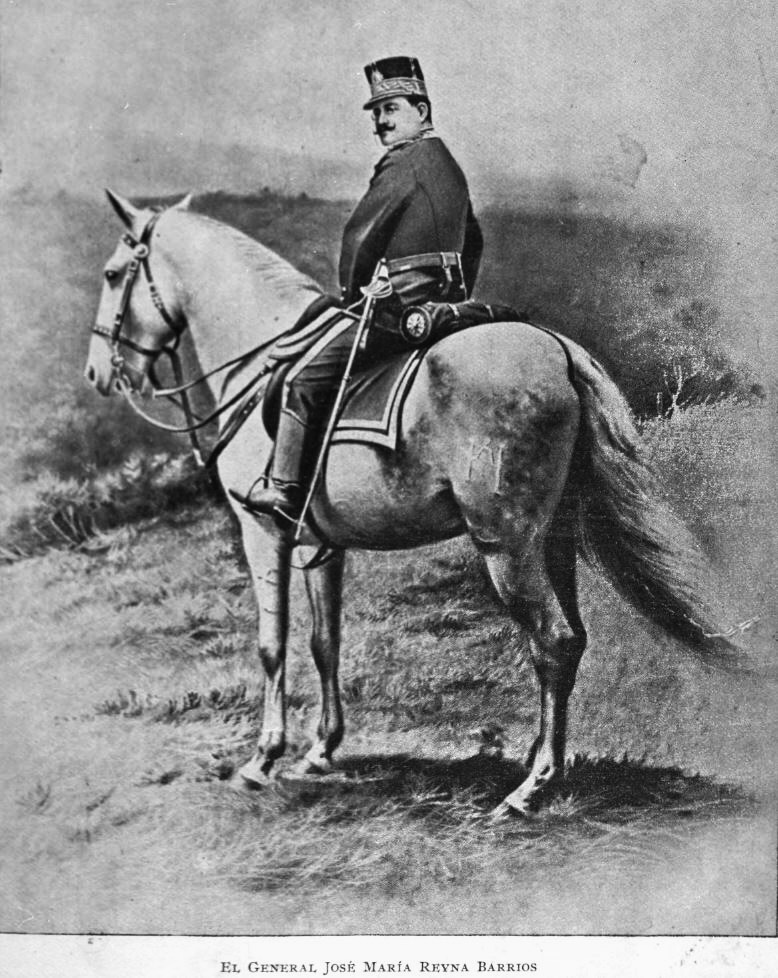
First instant photograph ever made in Guatemala. It shows general Reyna Barrios during military exercise in Guatemala City in 1896.

Barillas then brought in Dr. Montúfar and interrogated him in the same or similar way as he had done Mr. Lainfiesta. Dr. Montúfar responded in similar terms as Lainfiesta, stressing his claims to obedience of the Constitution and strict enforcement.

Finally general Reyna Barrios came in; when in the midst of pleasant conversation, General Barillas repeated his question, and Reyna replied, with a sincere smile: "We should not even talk about that, general; because you and I are the same. Rest assured that I will know how to respect and protect you." And then both shook hands with effusion. By the election period, the first two days of voting favored Lainfiesta. But by the third day, a huge column of Quetzaltenango and Totonicapán Indigenous people came down from the mountains to vote for general Reyna Barrios. The official agents did their job: Reyna was elected president and, not to offend the losing candidates, Barillas gave them checks to cover the costs of their presidential campaigns. Reyna Barrios, of course, received nothing, but he went on to become president on 15 March 1892.

== Government ==
During Barrrios's first term in office, the power of the landowners over the rural peasantry increased. He oversaw the rebuilding of parts of Guatemala City on a grander scale, with wide, Parisian style avenues built. He oversaw Guatemala hosting the first "Exposición Centroamericana" ("Central American Fair") in 1897. During his second term, Barrios printed bonds to fund his ambitious plans, fuelling monetary inflation and the rise of popular opposition to his regime.

1897 Central America Fair

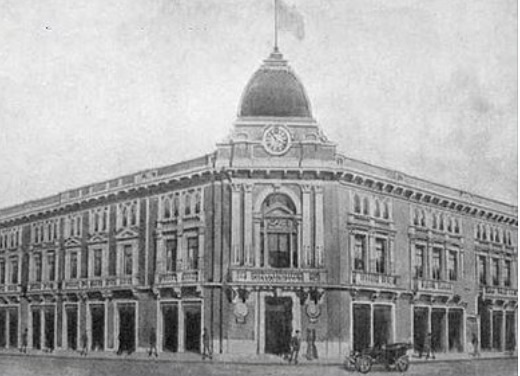
Hotel Exposición 1896

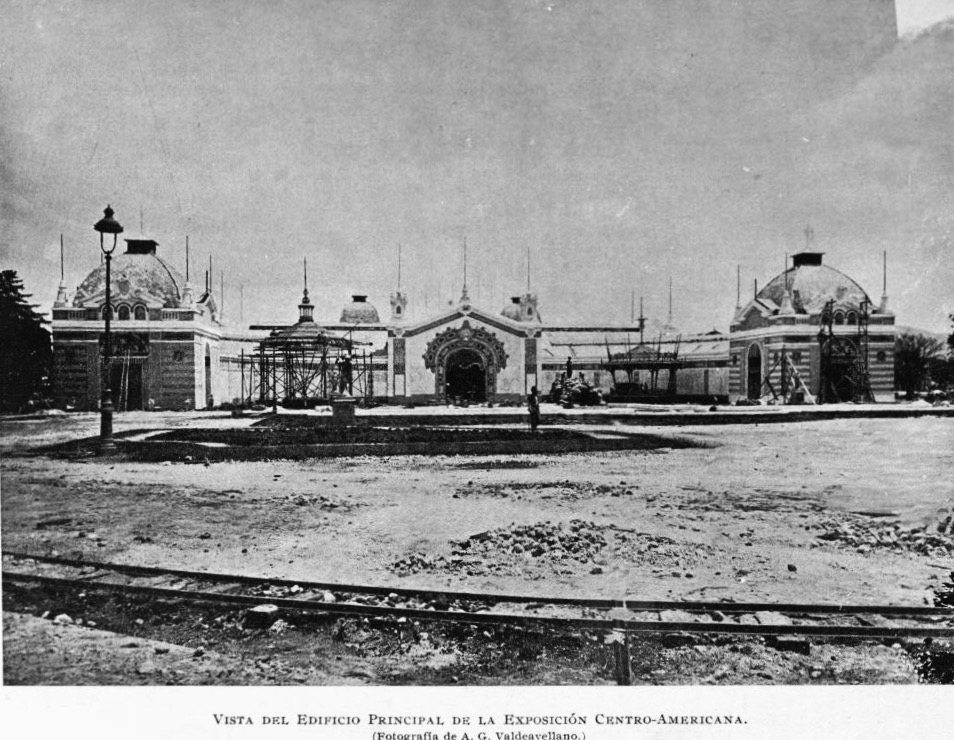
Central American Fair hall ready for its grand opening.

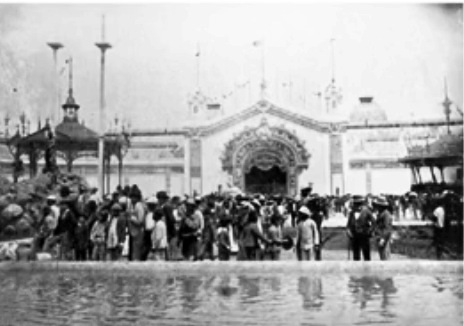
1897 Central American Fair hall during the event.

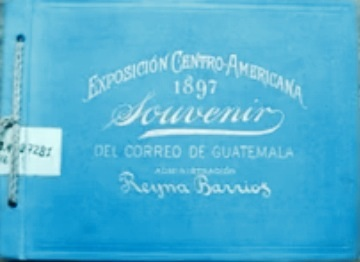
Central American Fair booklet, printed by the Guatemalan Post Office.

Reyna Barrios planned the 1897 Central America Fair to showcase the agricultural, cultural and commercial advances in Guatemala to potential international investors. His main focus was on the transoceanic railway, which at the time was an excellent economic option for either the United States or several European nations, given that the Panama Canal did not exist then.

=== Infrastructure ===
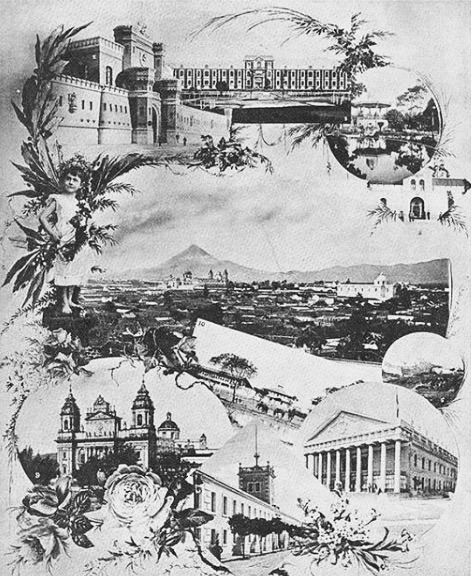
Poster of Guatemala city during Reyna Barrios administration.

As part of the efforts for the Central American Expo, his government embellished the city with avenues and monuments following Parisian style and built the Northern Railroad of Guatemala. Due to the 1917-1918 earthquakes most of these structures were lost.

His administration also work on improving the roads, installing national and international telegraphs and introducing electricity to Guatemala City. Completing a transoceanic railway was a main objective of his government, with a goal to attract international investors at a time when the Panama Canal was not built yet.

Buildings and monuments built during Reyna Barrios administration
Monument	Image	After 1917-1918	Location	Description
Plaza de Armas -Central Square- remodeling			Guatemala City Center	As part of the Central America Fair, Reyna Barrios ordered a series of monument and building constructions. Among them, he remodeled Central Square, removing the old Spanish Fountain and adding an elegant iron fence to the area.
Presidential Palace			Plaza de Armas -Central Square-	Reyna Barrios hired Spaniard architect José de Bustamante, to build his Presidencial Palace. The contract was approved on 8 February 1895, and the structure was built in a garden of the old Spanish Royal Palace. It cost around 400,000 pesos; construction began on 1 January 1895, and the Palace was opened to the public on 24 December 1896. It was the headquarters for the Government executive branch during Reyna Barrios and Manuel Estrada Cabrera administrations, until it was destroyed by the 1917-1918 earthquakes.
"30 de junio" boulevard			Extension towards the south of Guatemala City.	Avenue built in honor of the Liberal Reform from 1871. Several monuments, palaces and halls were built along the road. Only some statues survived the earthquakes of 1917–18.
"La Reforma" Palace and Museum			"30 de junio" boulevard	Located at the end of the "30 de junio" boulevard, this palace and museum was a favorite place for tourists and nationals alike, until it was destroyed by the 1917-18 earthquakes. In its place, later a monument to the Independence was built.
Central American Fair Hall		N/A	"30 de junio" boulevard	Built for the Central American Fair of 1897.
Registro de la Propiedad Inmueble	N/A		Old plaza of Guatemala City	Originally built for the Real Estate Record office, it was one of the very few buildings that survived the 1917-18 earthquakes. Later, it was transformed into the National History Museum.
Escuela Agrícola de Indígenas			"La Aurora" city park	This agriculture school was in the "La Aurora" city park. Later, it was used for the Male Normal School, but was destroyed by the 1917-1918 earthquakes.

== Death ==
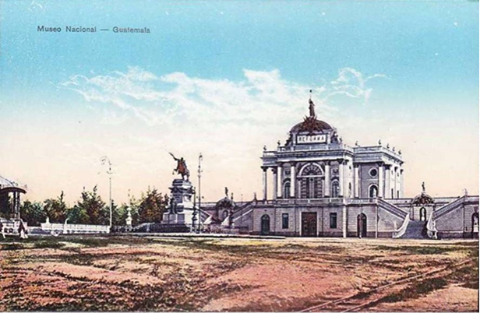
Palace of La Reforma. Built by Reyna Barrios between 1892 and 1898. it was destroyed by the 1917 Guatemala earthquake.

Barrios was assassinated on 8 February 1898, at No. 8 on 8th Street in Guatemala City at 8:00 PM local time by Edgar Zollinger, a British citizen and administrator of the Aparicio Family business, who shot him with a .38 caliber revolver. After shooting the president, he was shot eight times by defenders. Zollinger took revenge since back on 13 September 1897, Reina Barrios had Juan Aparicio killed in an unlawful manner. Aparicio was the former Mayor of Quetzaltenango. His assets included the Zunil Electrical Plant, The Los Altos Railroad, Coffee Plantations and Local Bank. These businesses were appropriated illegally, leaving the Aparicio family in ruins for decades. The population mourned the death of Aparicio as he was loved for helping and aiding others. Reina Barrios lived his last moments as a criminal. His actions caused irreversible damage to Guatemalan infrastructure.

== See also ==
- Exposición Centroamericana
- History of Guatemala
- Northern Railroad of Guatemala
- Manuel Estrada Cabrera

== Notes and references ==
=== Bibliography ===
- Castellanos, Lorena (2014). Vida y obra de José María Reyna Barrios. Francisco Marroquín University (in Spanish). Guatemala. Archived from the original on 3 November 2014.
- De los Ríos, Efraín (1948). Ombres contra Hombres (in Spanish) (2nd ed.). México: Fondo de la Cultura de la Universidad de México.
- Fernández Alfaro, Joaquin Alberto (2014). El Canciller Montúfar (in Spanish) (1st. ed.). San José, Costa Rica: Instituto Manuel María de Peralta, Ministerio de Relaciones Exteriores y Culto de Costa Rica. p. 384.
- Hernández de León, Federico (1959). "El capitulo de las efemerides". La Hora (in Spanish). Guatemala.
- — (1930). El libro de las efemerides (in Spanish). Vol. 3. Guatemala: Tipografia Sanchez y de Guise.
- La Ilustración Española y Americana (1876). "Doctor don Lorenzo Montúfar y Rivera, Ministro plenipotenciario de Guatemala en Madrid". Fundación Joaquín Díaz (in Spanish). 20 (79).
- Luján Muñoz, J. (2003). Las Revoluciones de 1897, La Muerte de J. M. Reina Barrios y la Elección de M. Estrada Cabrera (in Spanish). Guatemala: Artemis & Edinter. ISBN 9788489766990.
- Mendoza, Juan Manuel (1946). Enrique Gómez Carrillo: estudio crítico-biográfico; su vida, su obra y su época (in Spanish) (2nd. ed.). Guatemala: Tipografía Nacional.
- Montufar, Lorenzo (1893). "Notions of international law and laws of war, for the Central American armies". archive.org.
- Valdeavellano, Alberto G. (1896). "Fotografías de la Ilustración Guatemalteca". La Ilustración Guatemalteca (in Spanish). I (1–13). Guatemala: Síguere, Guirola & Cía.

Preceded by Manuel Lisandro Barillas Bercián	President of Guatemala; 1892–1898	Succeeded by Manuel Estrada Cabrera
