= Joaquina Cabrera =

First Lady of Guatemala

Doña Joaquina Cabrera
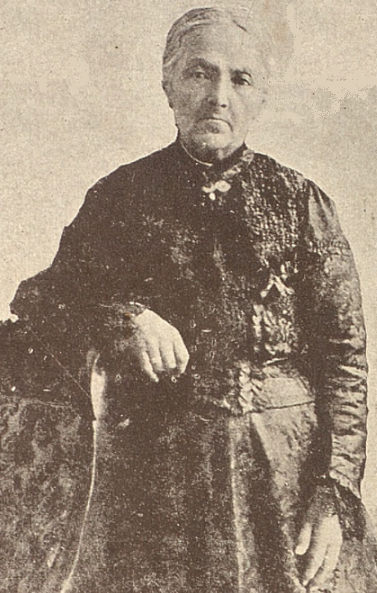
- Doña Joaquina Cabrera on the cover of La Locomotora, 11 August 1906

First Lady of Guatemala
- In role 8 February 1898 – 3 July 1908
- President: Manuel Estrada Cabrera
- Preceded by: Algeria Benton de Reyna
- Succeeded by: Mercedes Llerandi

First Mother of the Nation
- In role 8 February 1898 – 3 July 1908
- President: Manuel Estrada Cabrera
- Preceded by: Vacant (from 1897); Celia Barrios de Reyna
- Succeeded by: None; Position abolished

Personal details
- Born: Joaquina Arévalo Cabrera (Note: Cabrera's parents separated, so she retained her mother's surname, "Cabrera."); 21 August 1836 Quetzaltenango
- Died: July 3, 1908 (aged 71) Guatemala City
- Resting place: Quetzaltenango Cemetery
- Spouse: Pedro Raymundo Estrada Monzón (1856-1857)
- Children: Manuel Estrada Cabrera
- Parents: Valeriano Arévalo (father); Juana Cabrera (mother)

Joaquina Cabrera (21 August 1836 – 3 July 1908) was the de facto First Lady of Guatemala and mother of Guatemalan President Manuel Estrada Cabrera. She had a large amount of influence on her son's government and she would be honored on her birthday after her death as if she were still alive. Her funeral, which took place on 4–5 July 1908, began in Guatemala City and traveled through Amatitlán, Escuintla and Mazatenango before returning by train to her home town of Quetzaltenango, Guatemala.

== Early life ==
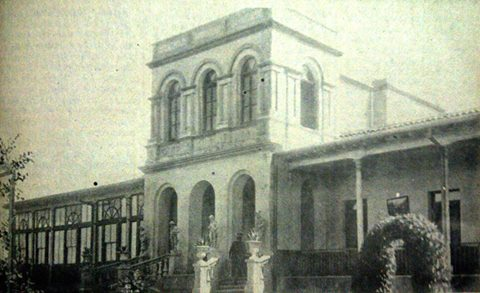
The remote San José Castle, where President Manuel Estrada Cabrera decided to relocate after two attempts on his life. Joaquina Cabrera would spend the last two months of her life living here.

Joaquina Cabrera was born to parents Valeriano Arévalo and Juana Cabrera in Quetzaltenango, Guatemala on 21 August 1836, but her parents would separate shortly thereafter. Much is unknown about Cabrera's early life but for the details recorded in historian Rafael Arévalo Martínez's book ¡Ecce Pericles! and the official Guatemalan government mouthpieces Álbumes de Minerva and La Locomotora, the latter of those once referring to Cabrera as "the Distinguished Doña Joaquina Cabrera de Estrada" even though she was not married. Historians generally agree that Cabrera and her son Manuel Estrada Cabrera led a humble life making and selling confectioneries in the streets of Quetzaltenango and catering for wealthy families in the locality such as the Aparicios. According to the Guatemalan writer Manuel Valladares Rubio, when Manuel was born, Joaquina left him in the care of a priest living next door to her, Pedro Estrada Monzón, who gave his surname (Estrada) to the boy.
