= Manuel Estrada Cabrera =

President of Guatemala from 1898 to 1920

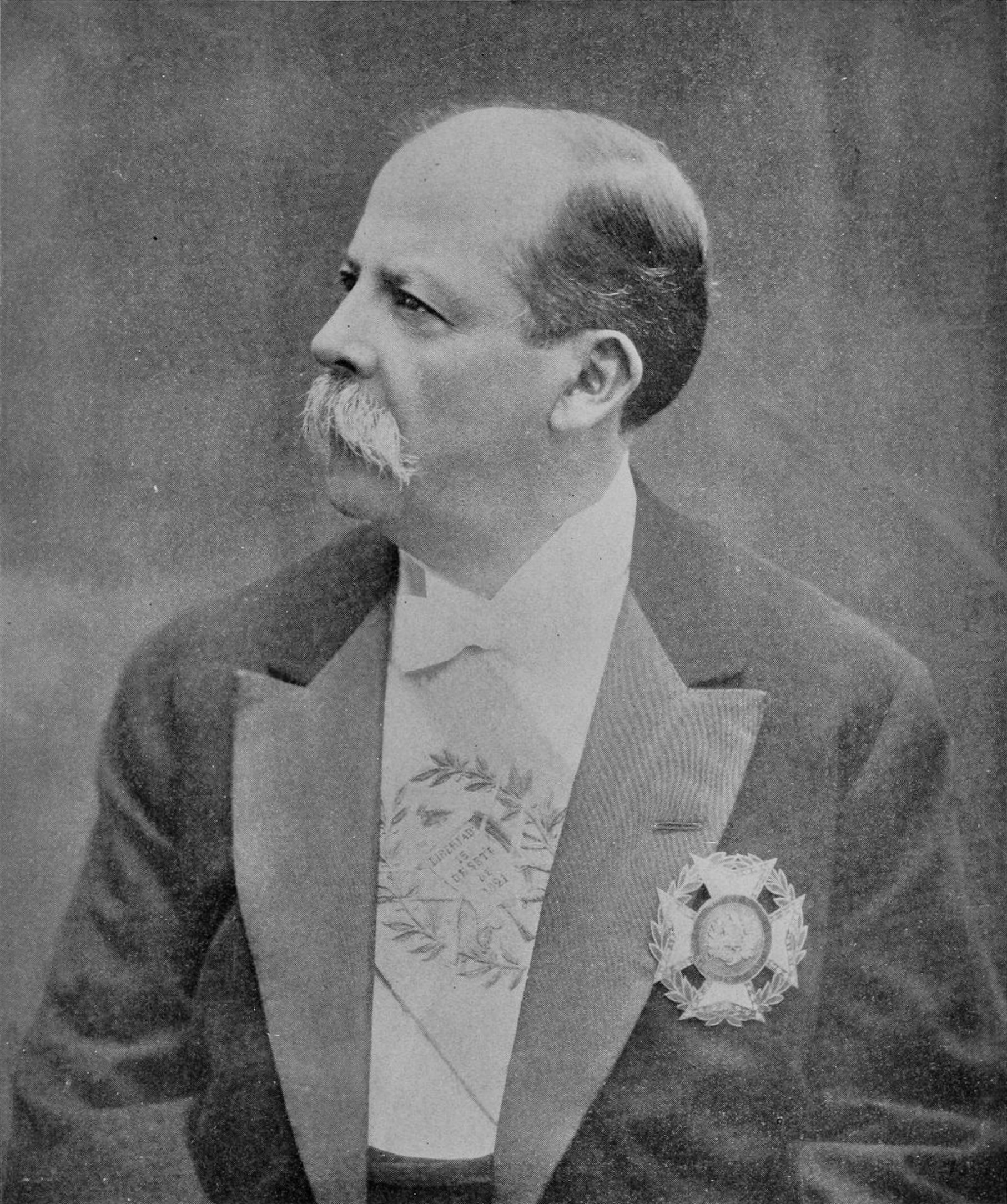
- Estrada Cabrera in 1916

13th President of Guatemala
- In office 8 February 1898 – 15 April 1920
- Preceded by: José María Reina
- Succeeded by: Carlos Herrera

10th Vice President of Guatemala
- In office 28 April 1897 – 8 February 1898
- President: José María Reina
- Preceded by: Manuel Morales Tovar
- Succeeded by: Feliciano Aguilar

Personal details
- Born: Manuel José Estrada Cabrera; 21 November 1857 Quetzaltenango, Guatemala
- Died: 24 September 1924 (aged 66) Guatemala City, Guatemala
- Party: Liberal Party of Guatemala
- Spouse: Desideria Ocampo
- Children: Diego and Francisco Estrada Ocampo, and others
- Occupation: Lawyer

Manuel José Estrada Cabrera (21 November 1857 – 24 September 1924) was the President of Guatemala from 1898 to 1920. A lawyer with no military background, he modernised the country's industry and transportation infrastructure, via granting concessions to the American-owned United Fruit Company, whose influence on the government was deeply unpopular among the population. Estrada Cabrera ruled as a dictator who used increasingly brutal methods to assert his authority, including armed strike-breaking, and he effectively controlled general elections. He retained power for 22 years through controlled elections in 1904, 1910, and 1916, and was eventually removed from office when the national assembly declared him mentally incompetent, and he was jailed for corruption. As such, he was the longest-serving leader of Guatemala.

== Background ==
Reyna Barrios Cabinet members

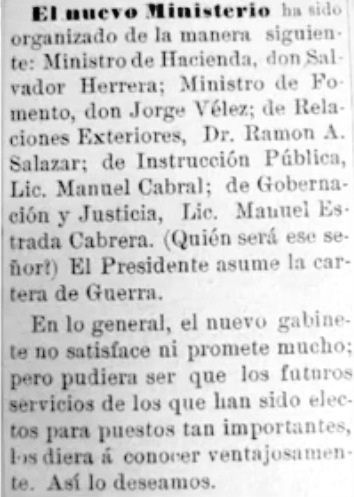
La República newspaper article.

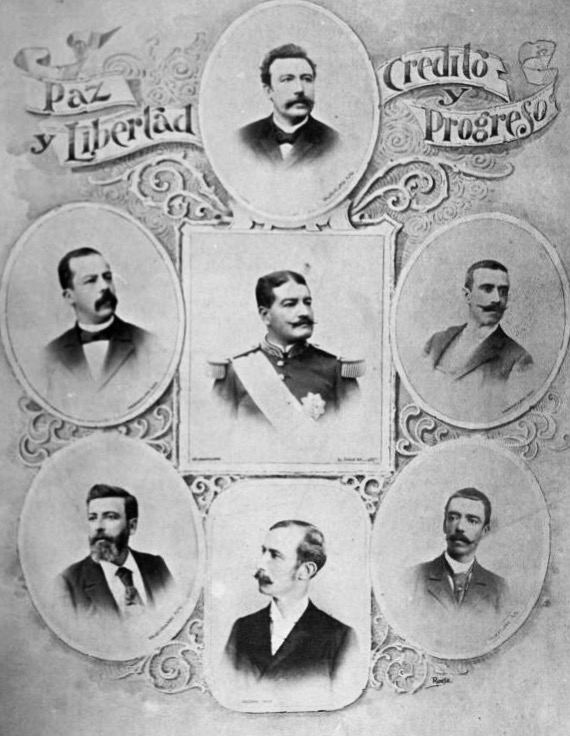
Cabinet members

Estrada Cabrera was a lawyer. He studied at the Universidad Nacional and thanks to his work he reached the position of "First Designated for the Presidency" when José María Reina Barrios was elected to his second term as president. He was also the Secretary of Interior for most of Reina Barrios regime.

== Interim President (1898) ==
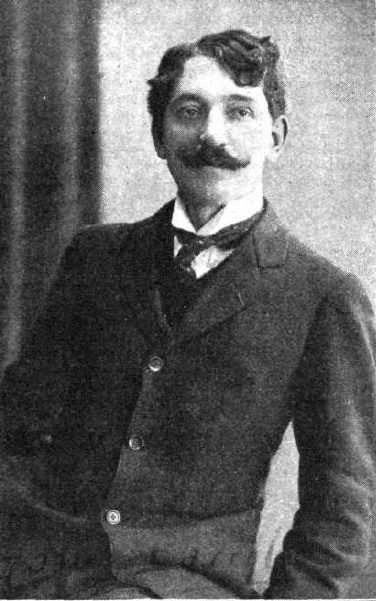
Enrique Gómez Carrillo, famous Guatemalan chronicler, journalist and a constant political propagandist for Estrada Cabrera, even to the point to duel in his name in Europe.

After the assassination of Reina Barrios on 8 February 1898, the Guatemalan cabinet called an emergency meeting to appoint a new successor, but declined to invite Estrada Cabrera to the meeting, even though he was the First Designated to the Presidency. There are two versions on how he was able to get the Presidency: (a) Estrada Cabrera entered "with pistol drawn" to assert his entitlement to the presidency and (b) Estrada Cabrera showed up to the meeting and demanded to be given the presidency as he was the First Designated".

The first Guatemalan head of state from civilian life in over 50 years, Estrada Cabrera overcame resistance to his regime by August 1898 and called for September elections, which he won handily. At that time, Estrada Cabrera was 44 years old; he was stocky, of medium height, and broad-shouldered. The mustache gave him a plebeian appearance. Black and dark eyes, metallic sounding voice and was rather sullen and brooding. At the same time, he already showed his courage and character. This was demonstrated on the night of the death of Reina Barrios when he stood in front of the ministers meeting in the government palace to choose a successor, and said: "Gentlemen, let me please sign this decree. As First Designated, you must hand me the Presidency". His first decree was a general amnesty and the second was to reopen all the elementary schools closed by Reyna Barrios, both administrative and political measures aimed at winning over public opinion. Estrada Cabrera was almost unknown in the political circles of the capital and one could not foresee the features of his government or his intentions.

=== Cabinet ===
- Interior and Justice: Francisco Anguiano
- Promotion: Antonio Barrios
- Finance: Rafael Salazar
- Public Instruction: Domingo Morales
- War: Salvador Toledo (replaced after a few months by Gregorio Contreras)
- Head of the Judiciary: José Pinto
- First appointed to the chair: Feliciano Aguilar
- Second appointed to the chair: Felipe Cruz

=== Call for Elections ===
From the pen of the writers of 'The Liberal Idea', especially that of Enrique Gómez Carrillo, these phrases out support for the first election of Manuel Estrada Cabrera:

- "(Estrada Cabrera) is a sincere man. He is also a committed man of good will and full of faith. Has strong ideas to fight for and for the sake of which would be sacrificed if necessary. He is a man."
- "His lips form a contrast with his eyes. The eyes always bright, always calm, reveal the inner strength and mastery of his own soul. The lips are kind and sentimental. The forehead is broad and without crease, a studious man forehead which reflects intellectual robustness"

And when the election was getting close:

- "Two months ago, our candidate was a hope; today he is a reality. Two months ago we encouraged confidence in his principles, in his heart and in his talent. Today is his behavior that enhances and strengthens our confidence. So, after having a candidate for the Liberal Party, today we have a candidate for the Homeland. It was what we needed. Tomorrow, finally, every patriot will see to the best liberal patriotism and every nuance is that his liberalism."

In 1898 the legislature convened for the election of President Estrada Cabrera, who triumphed thanks to the large number of soldiers and policemen who went to vote in civilian clothes and to the large number of illiterate family members that they brought with them to the polls. Also, the effective propaganda that was written in the official newspaper "the Liberal Idea", run by the poet Joaquin Mendez. Among the writers were Enrique Gómez Carrillo, Rafael Spinola, Máximo Soto Hall and Juan Manuel Mendoza, (Note: Mendoza 1946, p. "Mendoza, a Nicaraguan, later would become Gómez Carrillo biographer.") and others.

Gómez Carrillo received as a reward for his work as political propagandist an appointment as general consul in Paris, with 250 gold pesos monthly salary, and immediately went back to Europe

The other candidates were:

- José Luis Castillo de Leon, who had 5 castillistas clubs in the capital and in 70 municipalities, and who was the strongest candidate.
- Francisco Fuentes, who had most of his supporters in Quetzaltenango.
- Feliz Morales, former Minister of Reyna Barrios.

== First term: United Fruit Company ==
One of Estrada Cabrera's most famous and most bitter legacies was the entry of the United Fruit Company into the Guatemalan economical and political arena. As a member of the Liberal Party, he sought to encourage development of the nation's infrastructure of highways, railroads, and sea ports for the sake of expanding the export economy. When Estrada Cabrera assumed the presidency, there had been repeated efforts to construct a railroad from the major port of Puerto Barrios to the capital, Guatemala City. Yet, due to lack of funding exacerbated by the collapse of the internal coffee industry, the railway fell sixty miles short of its goal. Estrada Cabrera decided, without consulting the legislature or judiciary, that striking a deal with the United Fruit Company was the only way to finish the railway. Cabrera signed a contract with UFC's Minor Cooper Keith in 1904 that gave the company tax-exemptions, land grants, and control of all railroads on the Atlantic side.

Estrada Cabrera often employed brutal methods to assert his authority, as was the fashion in Guatemala at the time. Like him, presidents Rafael Carrera y Turcios and Justo Rufino Barrios had led tyrannical governments in the country. Right at the beginning of his first presidential period, he started prosecuting his political rivals and soon established a well-organized web of spies.

One American Minister returned to the United States after he learned the dictator had given orders to poison him. Former President Manuel Barillas was stabbed to death in Mexico City, on a street outside of the Mexican presidential residence on Cabrera's orders; the street now bears the name of Calle Guatemala. Also, Estrada Cabrera responded violently to workers' strikes against UFC. In one incident, when UFC went directly to Estrada Cabrera to resolve a strike (after the armed forces refused to respond), the president ordered an armed unit to enter the workers' compound. The forces "arrived in the night, firing indiscriminately into the workers' sleeping quarters, wounding and killing an unspecified number."

In 1906 Estrada faced serious revolts against his rule; the rebels were supported by the governments of some of the other Central American nations, but Estrada succeeded in putting them down. Elections were held by the people against the will of Estrada Cabrera and thus he had the president-elect murdered in retaliation.

== Second term (1905–1911) ==
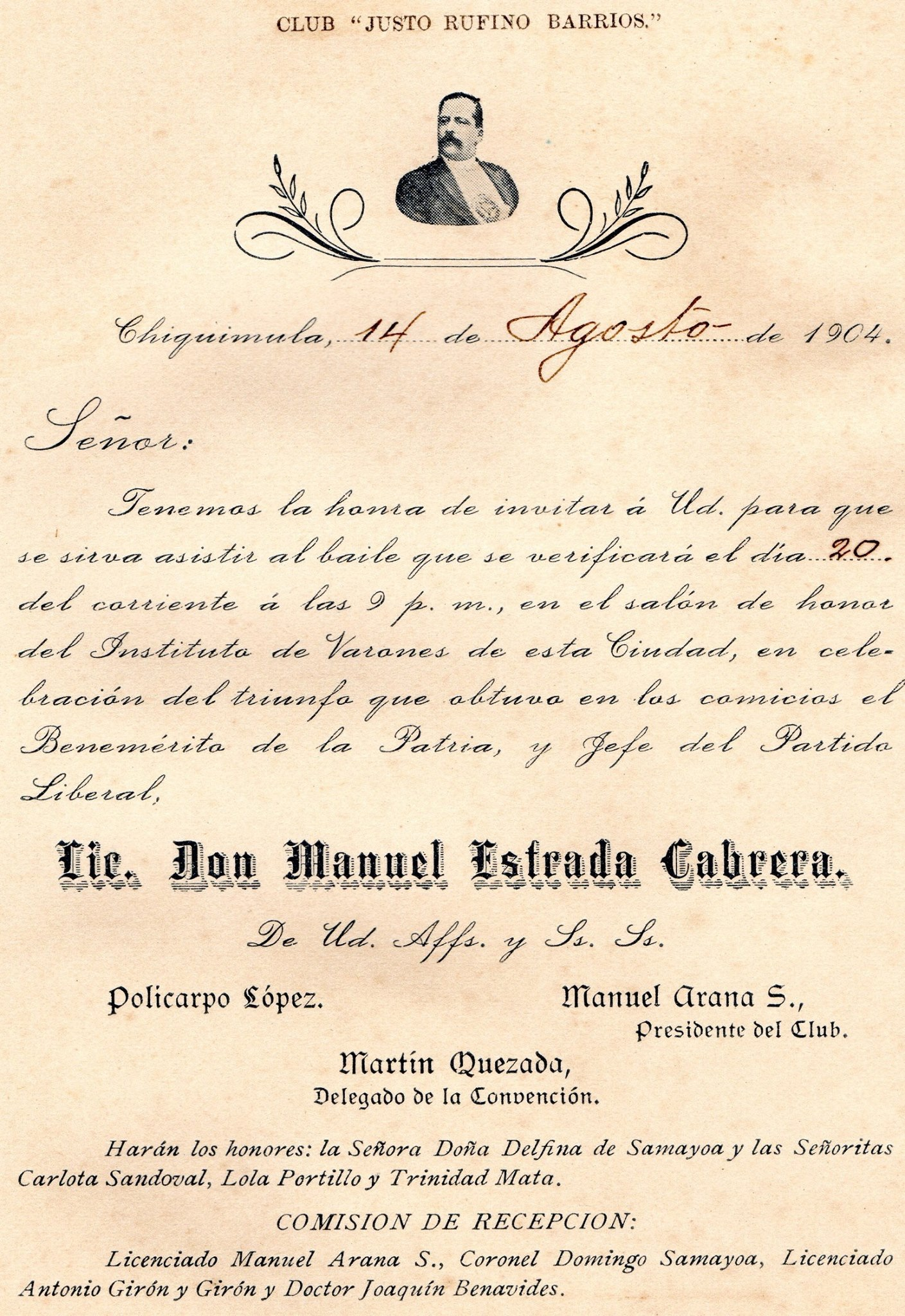
Invitation to the celebration of Estrada Cabrera 1904 reelection in Chiquimula.

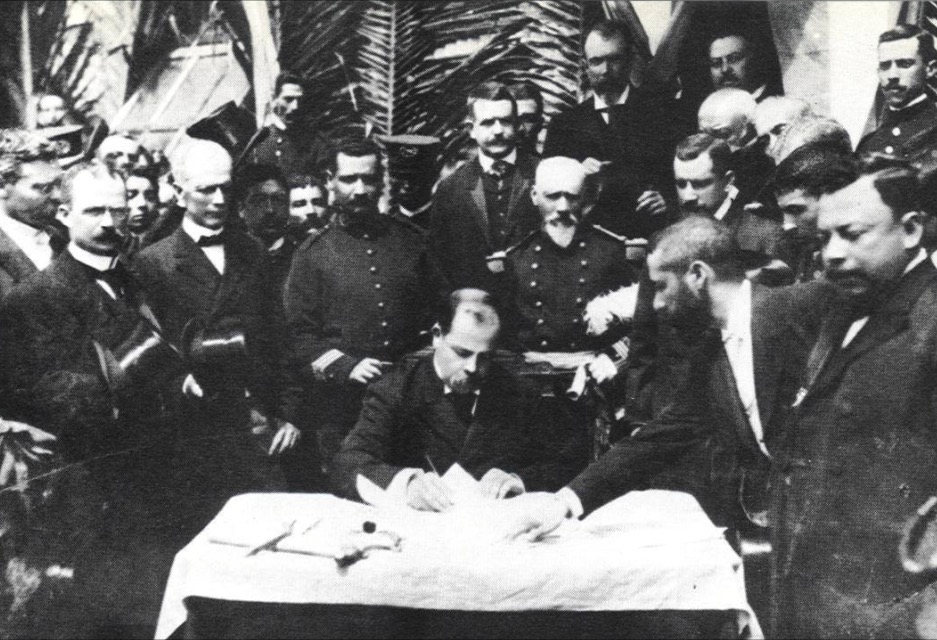
President Estrada Cabrera signing decrees. 1907.

Presidential elections were held on 7 August 1904, and Estrada Cabrera was again the winner. In December 1908 there was a measles epidemic all over the country, but it was efficiently controlled by the doctors of his regime.

Cabinet members:

- Infrastructure Secretary: Joaquín Méndez
- War Secretary: Luis Molina
- Secretary of Foreign Relations: Juan Barrios M.
- Secretary of the Interior: José María Reina Andrade
- Secretary of Education: Angel M. Bocanegra
- National Assembly:
  - President: Arturo Ubico Urruela
  - Secretary: José A. Beteta
  - Secretary: Francisco C. Castañeda
  - Cotzumalguapa representative: Carlos Herrera
  - Flores, Petén representative: Adrián Vidaurre, who would also serve as War Auditor.
- United States Ambassadors:
  - Joseph W. J. Lee (19 March 1907 – 17 January 1908)
  - General George W. Davis (17 January 1908 – 9 October 1909)
  - Willam F. Sands (9 October 1909 – 1 October 1910)
  - Robert Stockton Renolds Hitt (1 October 1910 – 1911)
"Doña Joaquina" maternity ward

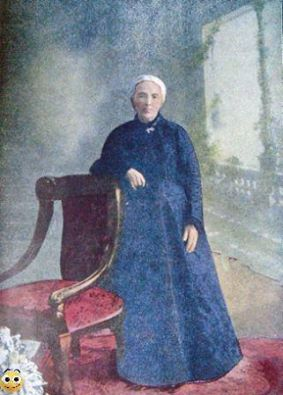
Joaquina Cabrera portrait. She was the mother of Estrada Cabrera.

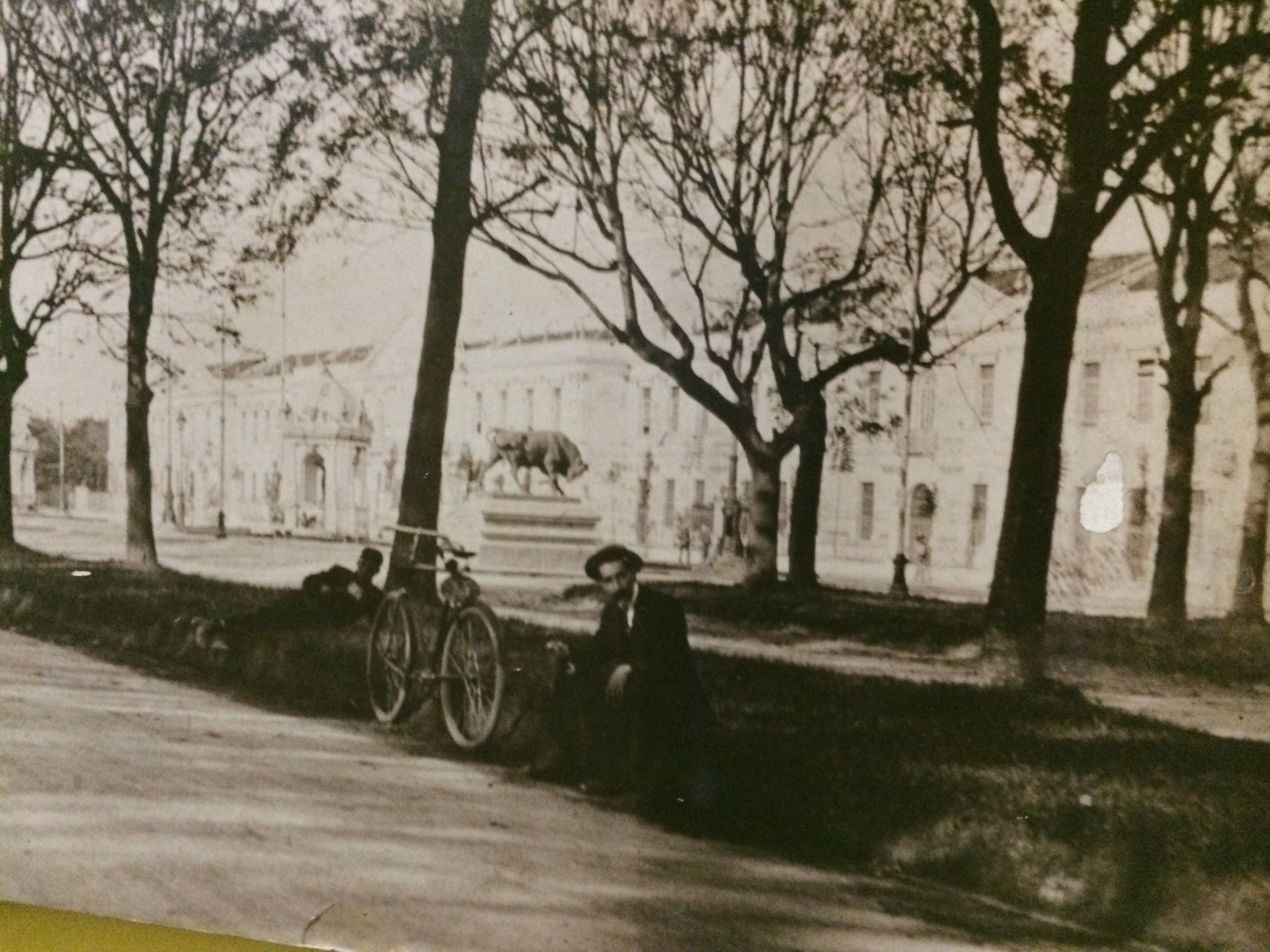
"Joaquina Cabrera" maternity ward

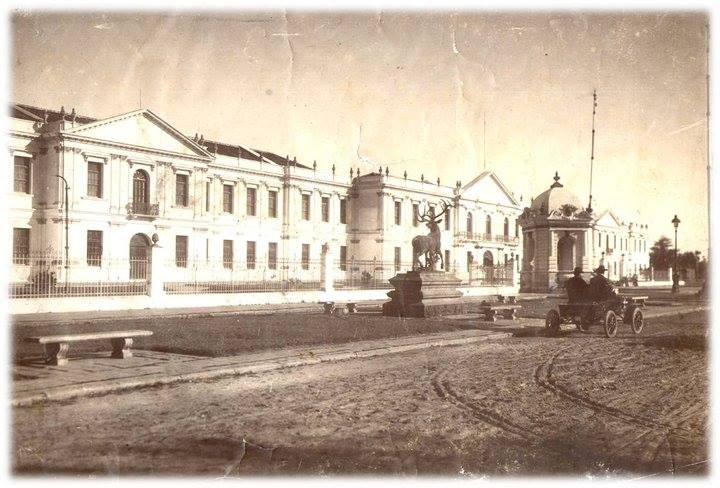
Another view of the ward

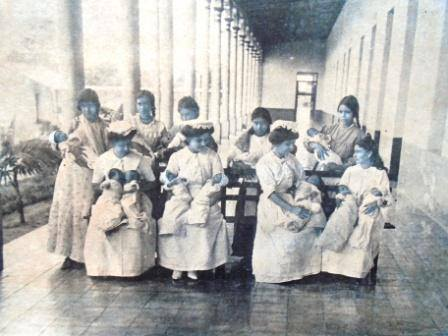
Newborn babies and their mothers.

Located on the "30 de junio" Boulevard, it was built in 1908 and destroyed by the earthquakes of 1917–1918. "Doña Joaquina", as she was known, was a strong influence in her son's life.

=== "The Bomb" assassination attempt ===
An Extra issue of El Guatemalteco on 29 April 1907, published the following:

«CRIMINAL ASSASSINATION ATTEMPT. At eight in the morning of today, when Mr. President of the Republic, Manuel Estrada Cabrera, left his home in his chariot and was on his way to the south of the city on the laudable mission to inspect the construction work that for the good of civilization and progress he ordered, a dynamite loaded mine activated by an electrical device, made a horrible explosion on the 7th. S. Avenue, between 16th and 17th W. streets. The detonation was horrendous and it was heard all over the city; but fortunately, for the good of the Motherland, its effects were far away from following the highly despicable desires of its criminal makers.

In early 1907, lawyer Enrique Ávila Echeverría and his brother, physician Jorge Ávila Echeverría, along with Dr. Julio Valdés Blanco and electrical engineer Baltasar Rodil, planned a bombing attack on the president of Guatemala, Estrada Cabrera, which took place on 29 April 1907, and is generally known in Guatemala as "The Bomb". The Echeverría brothers and their confederates were members of the elite class and had studied abroad, but when they returned to Guatemala, they objected to the government's extreme abuse of power and determined on assassinating the president. They decided on explosives. They prepared everything meticulously: the explosives, the detonators, the day and the exact time; even the president's driver—Patrocinio Monterroso—was part of the conspiracy.

On the day planned for the attack, 29 April, the president was traveling in the capital in his chariot along with his 13-year-old son, Joaquin, and his chief of staff, general José María Orellana. Around 10 a.m., the president and his retinue were traveling on 7th S. Avenue, between the 16th and 17th W streets when the bomb detonated. The explosion failed to injure Estrada Cabrera or those that were with him. Only the driver and one of the horses died.

On 2 May 1907, Emilio Ubico, brother of Arturo Ubico Urruela—president of Congress—and uncle of Jorge Ubico Castañeda—political chief of Verapaz, was appointed Chief of Police, in charge of the investigations, along the Secretary of the Interior, Reina Andrade. A few days later, Congress issued Decree 737, by which any explosive-related import was prohibited, unless previously authorized by the Secretary of War.

Over the next twenty-two days, the four conspirators fled through the small streets and little holes that they could find, trying to escape from Guatemala City, but the government surrounded the city and slowly tightened the perimeter while combing every inch of terrain. The conspirators' families were incarcerated and prosecuted. Others conspirators, brothers Juan and Adolfo Viteri and Francisco Valladares, were arrested when they attempted to flee disguised as women in Guastatoya. Others, like Felipe and Rafael Prado Romaña, tried to flee to El Salvador, but were captured when someone informed on them. The Romaña brothers remained imprisoned until their death. Only the Colombian Rafael Madriñán escaped the country on a bicycle. The mother of the Romaña brothers took the Mexican Ambassador, Federico Camboa, to the house where the Avila Echeverría brothers and his friends were hiding, who, knowing that they had only days to live, gave him all their valuables and begged him to pass them on to their relatives.

At last, after several days of uncertainty, Rufina Roca de Monzón gave them shelter in the second floor of her home, # 29 Judío Place in Guatemala City, but a spy learned about it. On 20 May 1907, at 3 a.m. the house was surrounded by a platoon of soldiers. The troop broke down the door and tried to reach the second floor, but at that moment gunfight began. By 6 a.m. the conspirators were out of ammo and exhausted and decided to kill themselves before becoming prisoners of the regime. The Diario de Centro América, then a semi-official newspaper owned by Estrada Cabrera, went as far as to publish the conspirators autopsy details.

=== "The cadets" assassination attempt ===
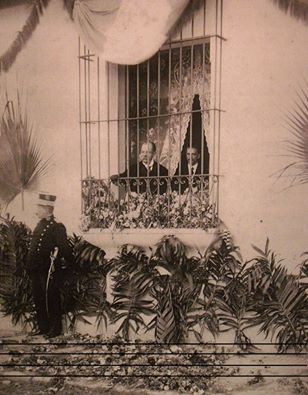
President Estrada Cabrera watching a procession from his balcony. This was a common occurrence before the assassination attempt of 1908.

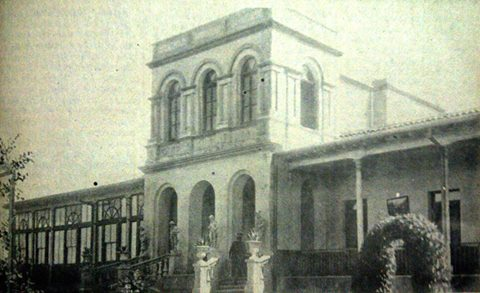
La Palma presidential residence; after a couple of assassination attempts against him, Estrada Cabrera decide to move to this secluded location outside the city.

By 1908, Santo Domingo Church members had modified the path of its centennial and traditional Good Friday procession, such that now it passed in front of Estrada Cabrera's house on the 7th S. Avenue in Guatemala City. That year, several Military Academy cadets, after noticing that the procession uniforms completely covered the face of the penitents, decided to disguise themselves and blend in with the procession and by the time it passed in front of the president's house, they would storm in and take him prisoner. However, the extremely efficient spy system that Estrada Cabrera had in place allowed him to thwart the kidnapping attempt. As soon as he learned about this, Estrada Cabrera prohibited the procession from passing in front of his house, placed a fence in front of it and prohibited the use of masks for the Holy Week processions.

On 20 April 1908, during the official reception of the new United States Ambassador in the National Palace, Military Academy cadet Víctor Manuel Vega, in revenge for what happened to his classmates and teachers, shot Estrada Cabrera point blank, but only managed to hurt him on his pinky finger. A flag from the official escort kept the bullet from reaching the president. Enraged, and in order to set a precedent, Estrada Cabrera ordered the shooting death of all Vega's Military Academy unit, except two, Rogelio Girón and Manuel Hurtarte, who were taken prisoners without any legal document. Vega had died on the spot where he tried to attack the president, killed instantly by his bodyguards. The president also ordered the Military Academy to be closed, its building (Note: Which was located in the former monastery of La Recolección Church in Guatemala City.) demolished and that salt would be spread on the field. Several military officers were sent to prison, including some loyal to the president.

Conditions in the Penitentiary were cruel and foul. Political offenses were tortured daily and their screams could be heard all over the Penitentiary. Prisoners regularly died under these conditions since political crimes had no pardon.

It has been suggested that the extreme despotic characteristics of the man did not emerge until after an attempt on his life in 1907.

=== Suicide of his children ===
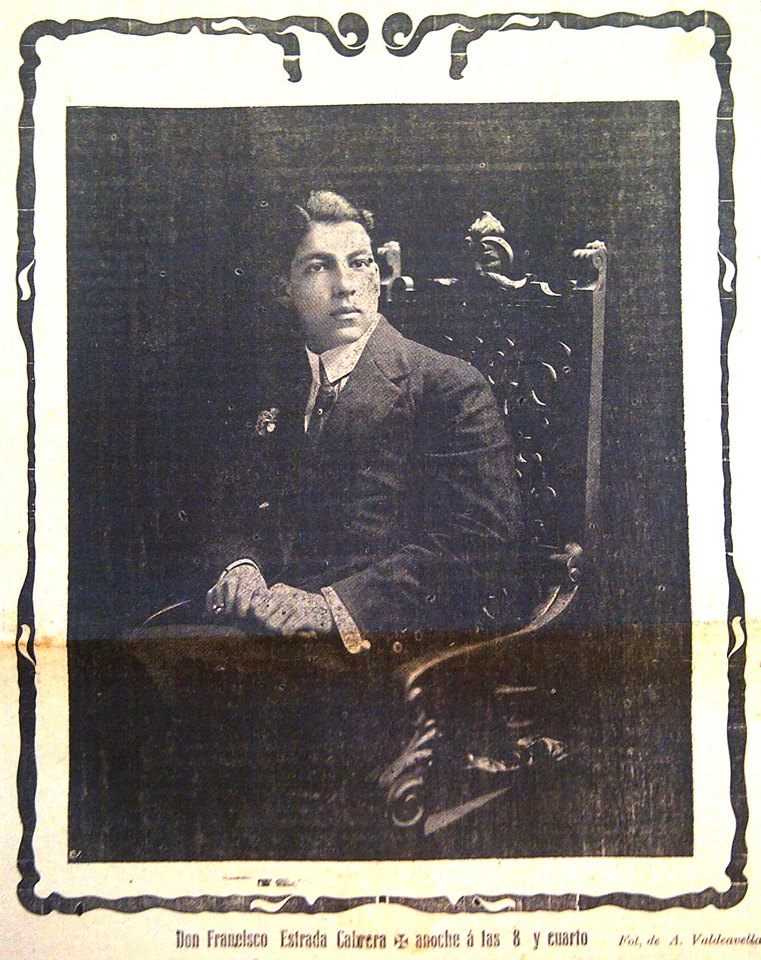
Francisco Estrada, son of Estrada Cabrera. He took his own life after a family argument on 8 November 1912.

In 1910 both his wife, Desideria Ocampo, and his firstborn child, Diego Estrada, died of tuberculosis. Desideria Ocampo died in Nice, France after Estrada Cabrera sent her there for treatment. Diego had contracted a venereal disease while he was studying in the United States. The treatment of this, and his previous excesses led to tuberculosis; unable to cope with it, he killed himself. On 8 November 1912, Francisco Estrada, who had just returned to Guatemala from Europe where he was learning agricultural technology in Paris, found himself in a 4000 dollar debt after courting a French lady older than himself. When Estrada Cabrera found out about this, he put the receipt under his son's dinner plate and waited for his reaction. When Francisco came down for dinner, he saw the receipt and turned pale. Without saying a word, he left the dining room and shot himself in his room.

== Third presidential term ==
=== New military academy ===
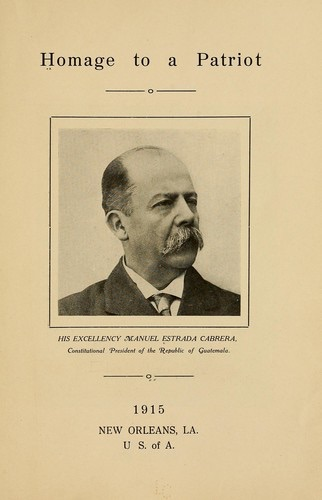
Homage to Estrada Cabrera in 1915.

Estrada Cabrera established a military academy in the Army Artillery Fort in 1915. The building, constructed in 1907, suffered severe damage during the 1917–1918 earthquakes, and was not open again until the end of 1919.

Military academy established in 1912

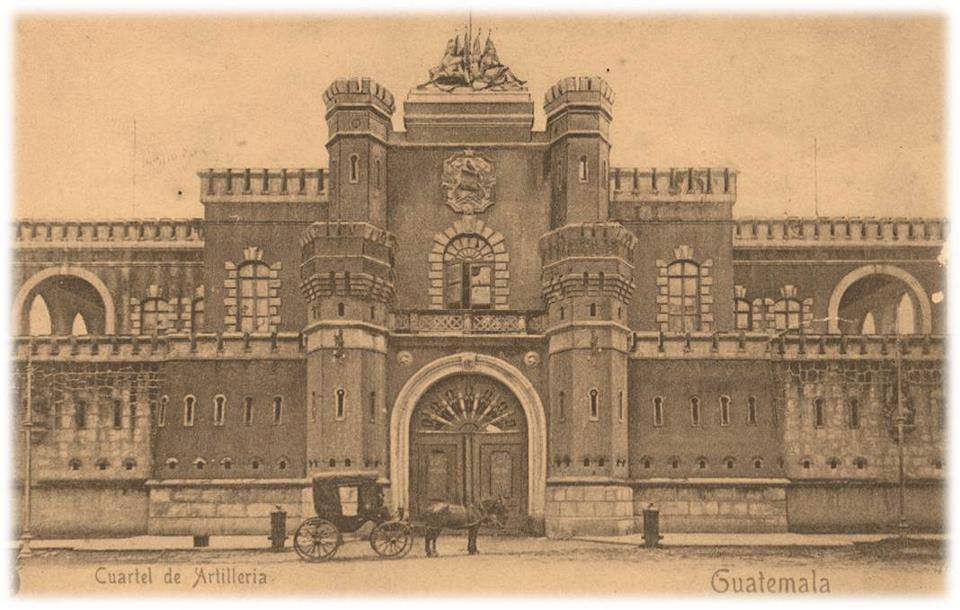
Front view of the Army Artillery Fort, 1912.

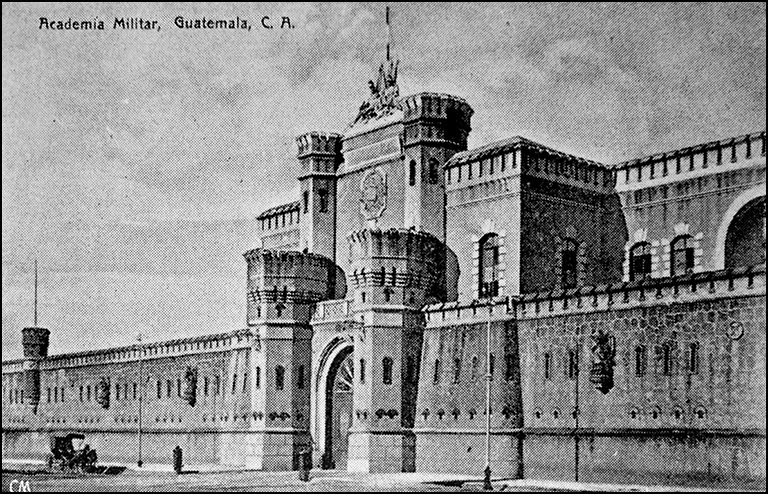
Military Academy in 1915.

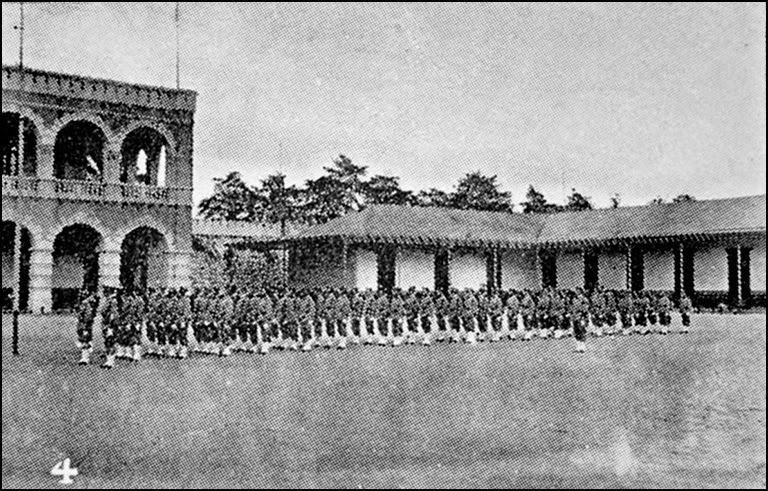
Military exercises inside the Academy.

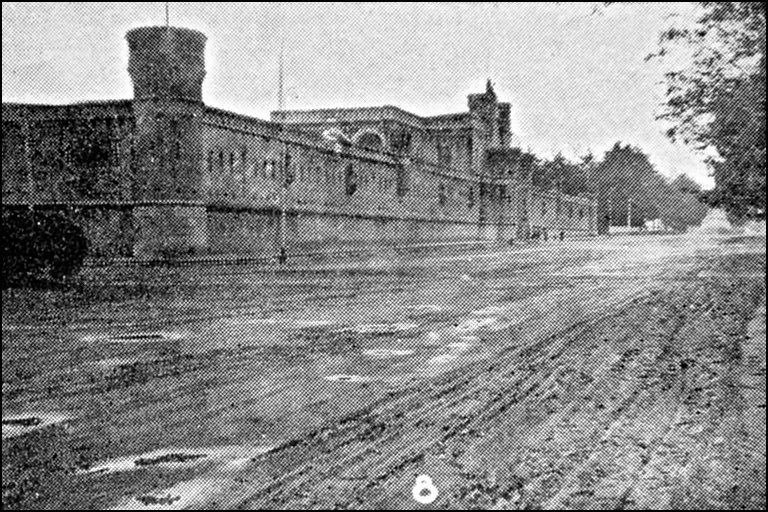
Military Academy from "La Reforma" boulevard.

== Fourth presidential term ==
=== Social structure ===
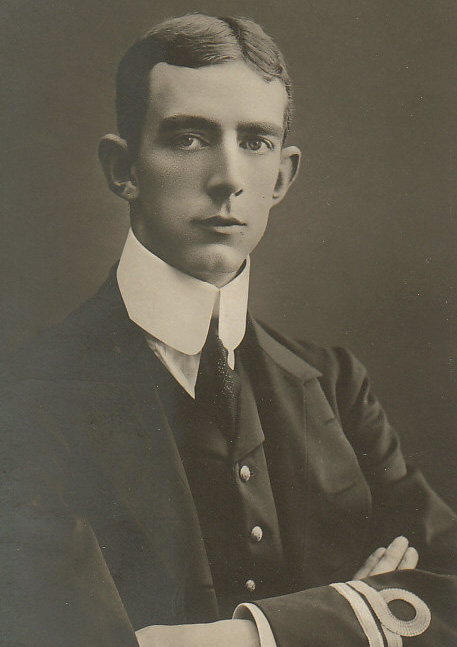
Prince Wilhelm of Sweden. Visited Guatemala in 1920, during the time Estrada Cabrera was overthrown and wrote his observations in his book Between two continents, notes from a journey in Central America, 1920, maybe the most objective account of the situation.

In 1920, prince Wilhelm of Sweden visited Guatemala and made a very objective description of both Guatemalan society and Estrada Cabrera government in his book Between two continents, notes from a journey in Central America, 1920. The prince explained the dynamics of Guatemalan society at the time pointing out that even though it called itself a "Republic", Guatemala had three sharply defined classes:

1. Criollos: a minority comprised originally by ancient families descendants of the Spaniards that conquered Central America and that by 1920 comprised both political parties in the country. By 1920, they were mixed to a large extent with foreigners and the great majority were of Indian descent. They led the country both politically and intellectually partly because their education, although poor by European standards of the time, was enormously superior to the rest of the people of the country, partly because only criollos were allowed in the main political parties and also because their families controlled and for the most part owned the cultivated parts of the country.
2. Ladinos: middle class. Formed of people born of the cross between natives, blacks and criollos. They held almost no political power in 1920 and comprised the bulk of artisans, storekeepers, tradesmen and minor officials. In the eastern part of the country they were usually agricultural laborers.
3. Indians: the majority conformed by a mass of natives. Slow of wit, uneducated and disinclined to all forms of change, they had furnished excellent soldiers for the Army and often rose, as soldiers, to positions of considerable trust given their disinclination for independent political activity and their inherent respect for government and officialdom. They made the main element in the working agricultural population. There were three categories within them:
  1. "Mozos colonos": settled on the plantations. Were given a small piece of land to cultivate on their own account, in return for work in the plantations for many months of the year.
  2. "Mozos jornaleros": day-laborers who were contracted to work for certain periods of time. They were paid a daily wage. In theory, each "mozo" was free to dispose of his labor as he or she pleased, but they were bound to the property by economical ties. They could not leave until they had paid off their debt to the owner, and they were victim of those owners, who encouraged the "mozos" to get into debt beyond their power to free themselves by granting credit or lending cash. If the mozos ran away, the owner could have them pursued and imprisoned by the authorities, with all the cost incurred in the process charged to the ever increasing debt of the mozo. If one of them refused to work, he or she was put in prison on the spot. Finally, the wages were extremely low. The work was done by contract, but since every "mozo" starts with a large debt, the usual advance on engagement, they became servants to the owner.
  3. Independent tillers: living in the most remote provinces, survived by growing crops of maize, wheat or beans, sufficient to meet their own needs and leave a small margin for disposal in the market places of the towns and often carried their goods on their back for up to twenty five miles a day.

=== Country condition ===
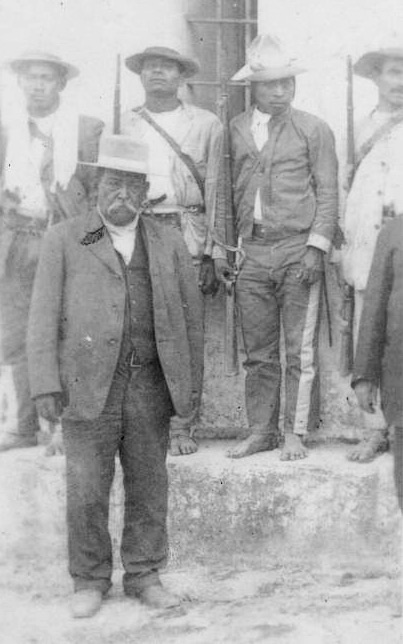
General with some of his soldiers after they were captured in «La Palma» on 14 April 1920. Note how the soldier were barefoot and lacked any kind of uniform.

Prince Wilhelm also described how the country was after two decades of government of Estrada Cabrera. Guatemala was naturally rich:

- On the Pacific coast one found sugar, coffee, spices and cocoa in great quantities; the plantations gave a splendid yield, and the productiveness of the soil in proportion to area was unique.
- On the east coast, there were enormous banana plantations.
- And on the highlands, maize, wheat and corn were grown, and fine coffee grew as far up as 1600 m above sea level.
- Minerals such as gold, copper, tin and quicksilver were abundant but they were not exploited because the natives kept their whereabouts closely concealed.

But the means of communication were poorly developed; aside from the railway that ran from shore to shore going through Guatemala City and was run by the United Fruit Company, there were only paths and tracks, marked on the maps as highways, but in reality just narrow mule-roads.

Guatemala was placed in a tough spot, after the previous president known as Jose Maria Reyna Barrios (1854-1898) started to introduce a new type of paper currency. Due to the input of these new dollars known as the Guatemalan Quetzal, their value would slowly start to decrease, resulting in economic inflation. However, Jose Maria Barrios was assassinated before he was able to complete this transition between paper currencies. As a result, Manuel Estrada Cabrera inherited a country with a huge economic problem. Unfortunately, he was unable to succeed instantly, for to keep his government afloat, plus improve on the countries educational system. He had to temporarily increase again the production of the quetzal, thus increasing inflation. To solve this growing issue, Cabrera called for the assistance of the well-known economist, Edwin W. Kremmerer in 1919. Kremmerer was able to restructure Guatemala’s monetary system, plus give a few tips on how to better improve it, unfortunately, none of these were applied for Estrada was overthrown before they could be implemented. Fortunately, he succeeded in making education easily obtainable for some of the most rural parts of Guatemala.

Besides being oppressed by brutal and dishonest officials and landowners, the natives were suffering of an endemic alcoholism problem. There were drinking establishments everywhere – as the government derived a certain revenue from the proceeds – often stocked with low quality spirits that had terrible effects on health. Both men and women drunk to excess regularly and changed their normally peaceful demeanor into an alcohol-induced rage that sometimes resulted in mutilations and murder.

By the fourth term of Estrada Cabrera, despotism prevailed. Universal suffrage was the rule, but presidential elections were a farce as only the President himself was allowed to figure on the ballot papers and opposition was forbidden as any rival candidate was looked after by the police, and detained at best if not killed outright. Besides, anyone declining to vote was a suspect at once, and each plantation received a list of how many "mozos" are to vote in the elections.

The president's ministers were simply his advisors and the state revenues had made its way to the presidential pocket: following the rule established by his predecessors managed to lay aside a fortune of 150 million, in spite of earning only US$1000 a year. The President chose the ministers from among his most faithful adherents, and they had no voice whatsoever in the final decision of affairs; and Congress was not much better, as no laws were ever passed without previous approval from the highest quarter. Finally, the courts of law were complete pledged to the presidential interests.

Throughout the entire administration prevailed rampant corruption. In the case of the president and ministers they procured additional revenues for themselves by granting concessions and the like; lower officials get money as they saw fit. All these issues were rarely known as everyone feared for their own life and keep silent.

=== Armed forces ===
There was a universal conscription law, but almost any one could obtain exemption by payment and in reality only "mozos" were recruited. If there was ever a need for additional recruits, they were gathered by force. The pay of the army went only as far as the generals; the rank and file went about in rags and beg; proper uniform and army boots was non-existent with the soldiers going around barefoot. There was one general for each 100 men and they were the only ones that had dilapidated half boots.

The soldiers, like the general population, were uneducated as it was in the interest of the authorities to keep them as ignorant as possible in order that the masses might be more easily led.

=== 1917–1918 earthquakes ===
The seismic activity started on 17 November 1917 and ruined several settlements around Amatitlán. On 25 and 29 December of the same year, and on 3 and 24 January of the next, there were stronger earthquakes felt on the rest of the country, which destroyed a number of buildings and homes in both Guatemala City and Antigua Guatemala.

The Diario de Centro América, a semi-official newspaper owned in part by President Estrada Cabrera, spent more than two months issuing two numbers a day reporting on the damage, but after a while, started criticizing the central government after the slow and inefficient recovery efforts. In one of its articles, it went as far as to tell that some holy Jesus sculptures from the City had been saved because they had been taken away from their churches after the first earthquake as they "did not want to stay anymore in a city where excessive luxury, impunity and terror were rampant". Likewise, the newspaper complained that the National Assembly was issuing "excellent" laws, but nobody was "going by the law". Finally, on its front page of May 1918, it complained that there was "still debris all over the city". The Diario de Centro América itself was print in the rubble, in spite of which it was able to issue its two daily numbers.

El Guatemalteco, the official newspaper, showed the impact of the disaster: its regular publication was interrupted from 22 December 1917 to 21 January 1918; when it reappeared, it was in a much smaller format.

Presidential palace ruins

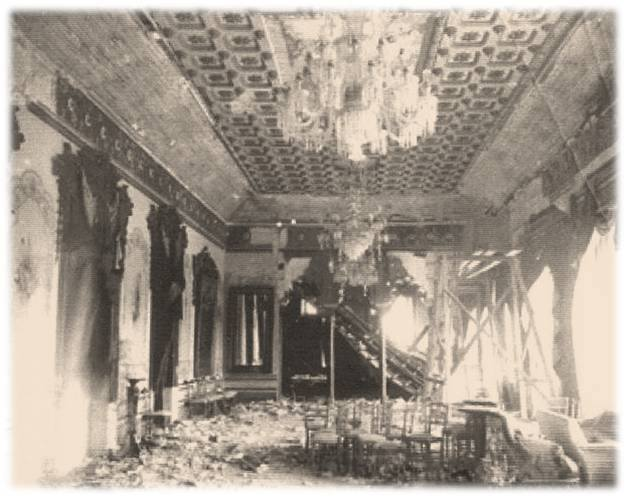
Ruins

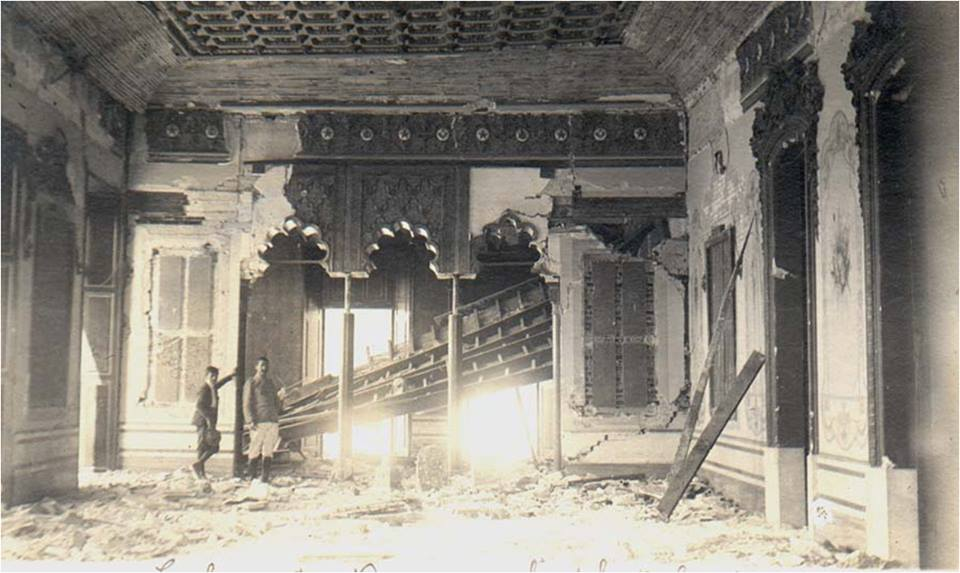
Inside

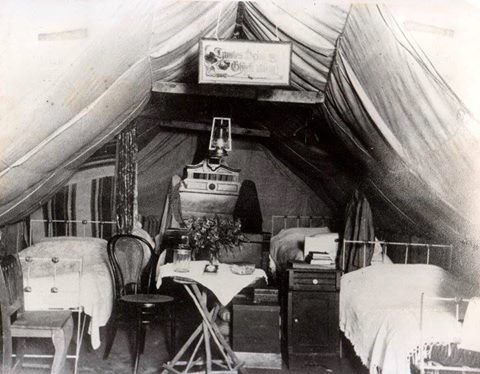
Camping tent on the outside

Church ruins

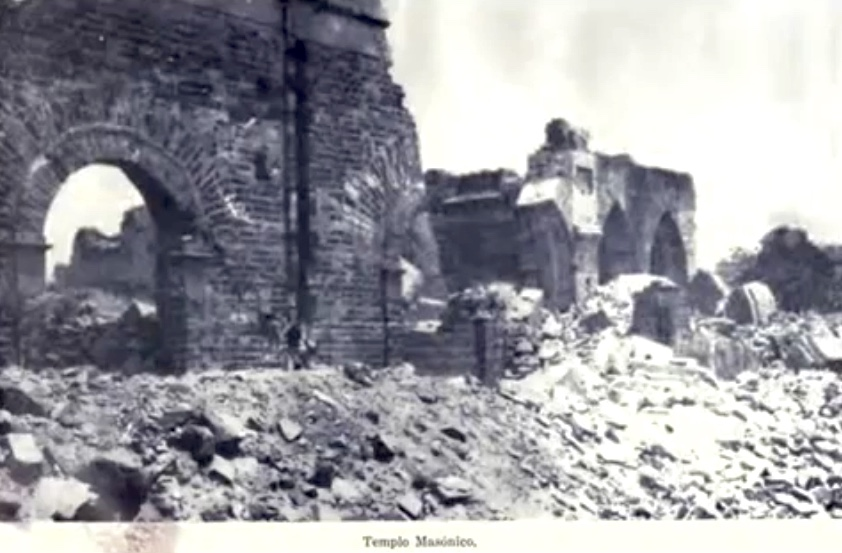
Guatemala Masonic temple

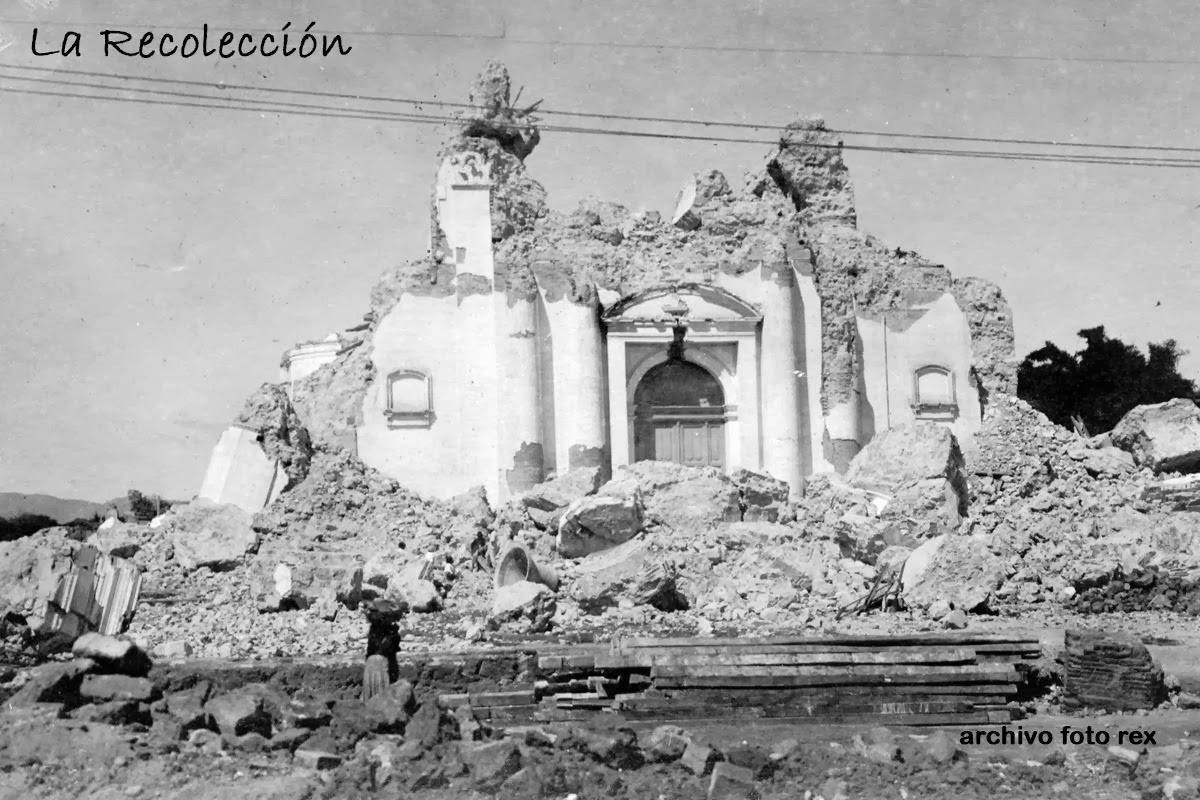
Laa Recolección

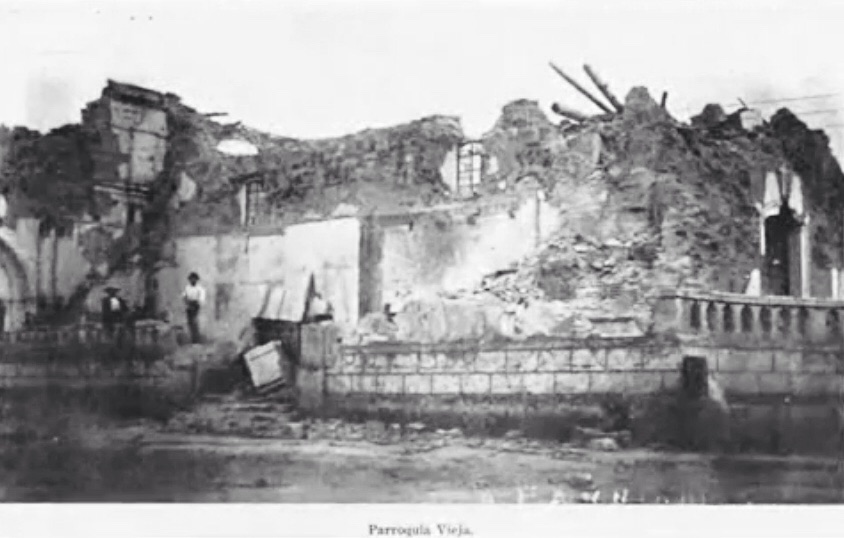
Parroquia Vieja

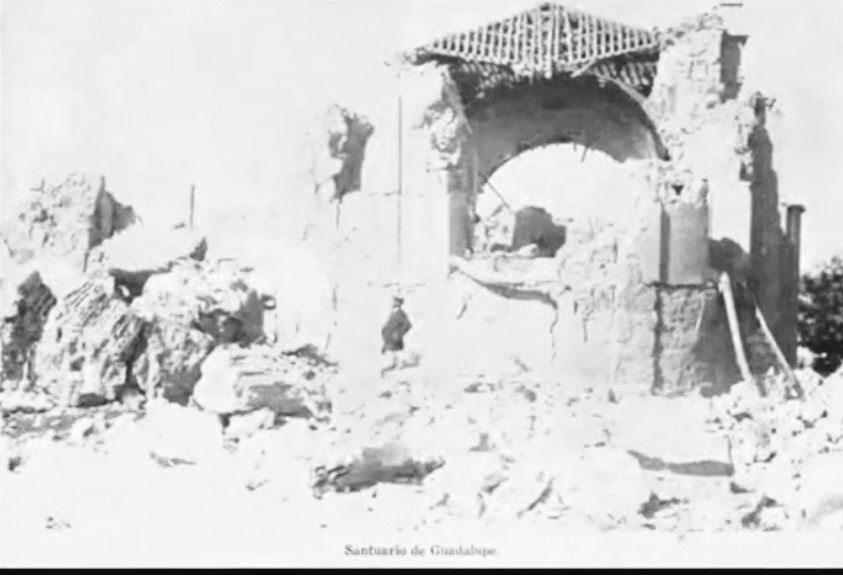
Santurario de Guadalupe

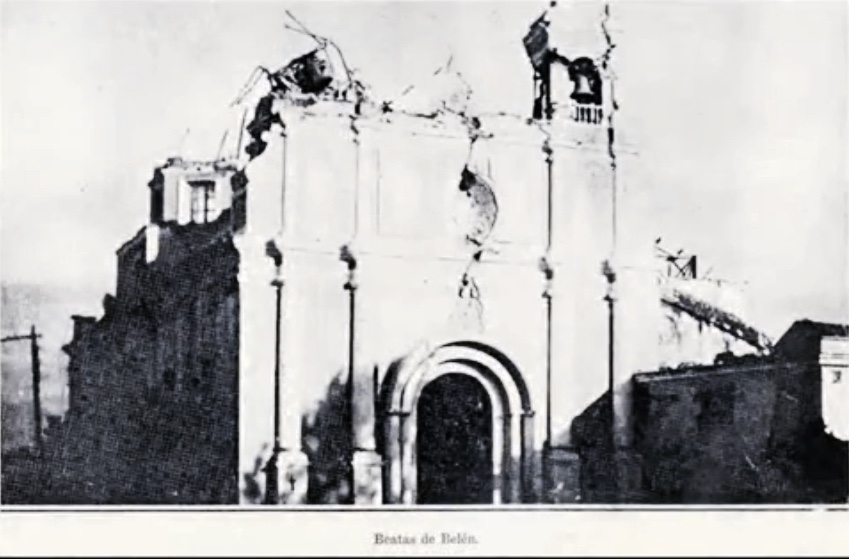
Beatas de Belén

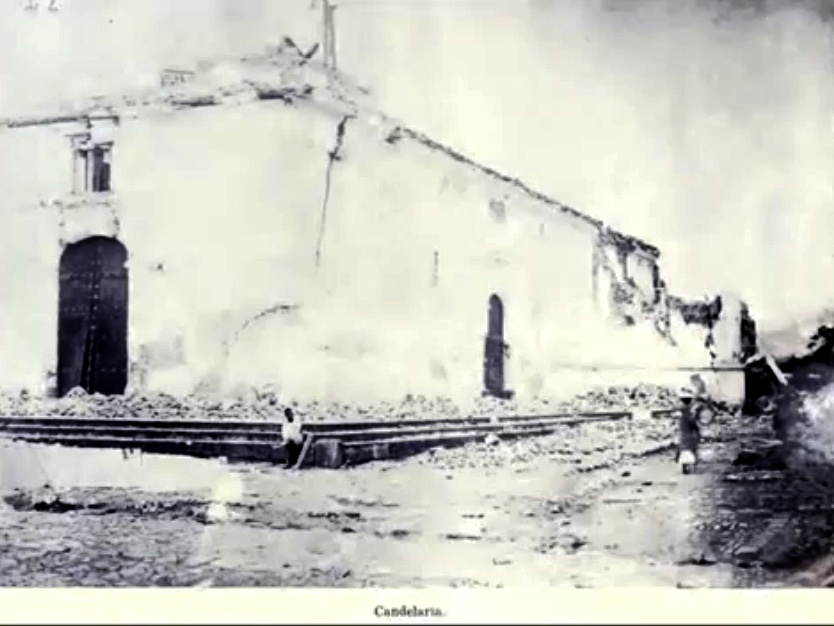
Belén monastery

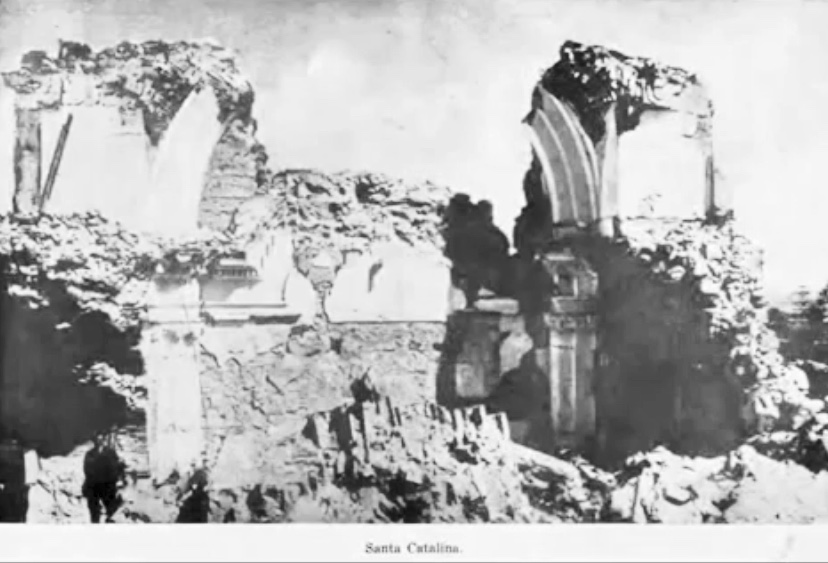
Santa Catalina

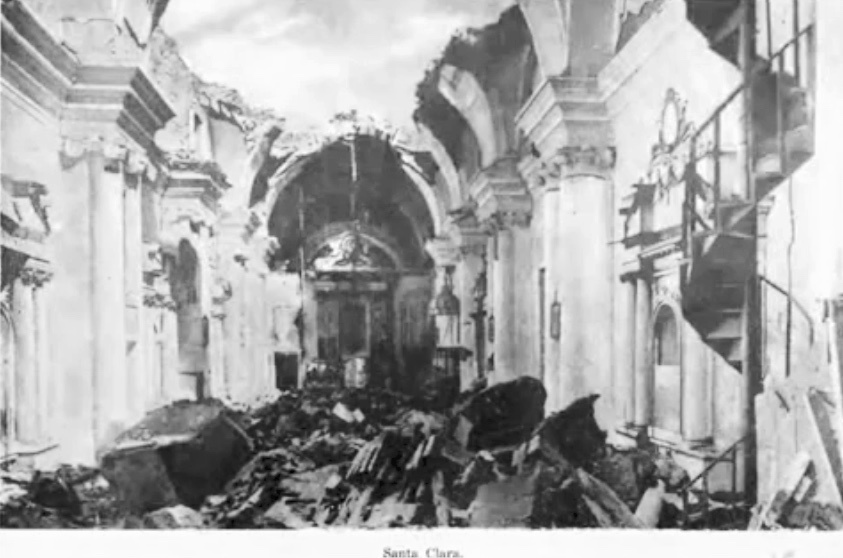
Santa Clara

== Unionist Party and end of Cabrera's regime ==
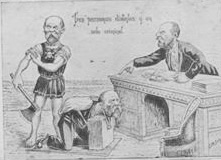
Political cartoon that appeared in early 1920: "Three different people and only one criminal.

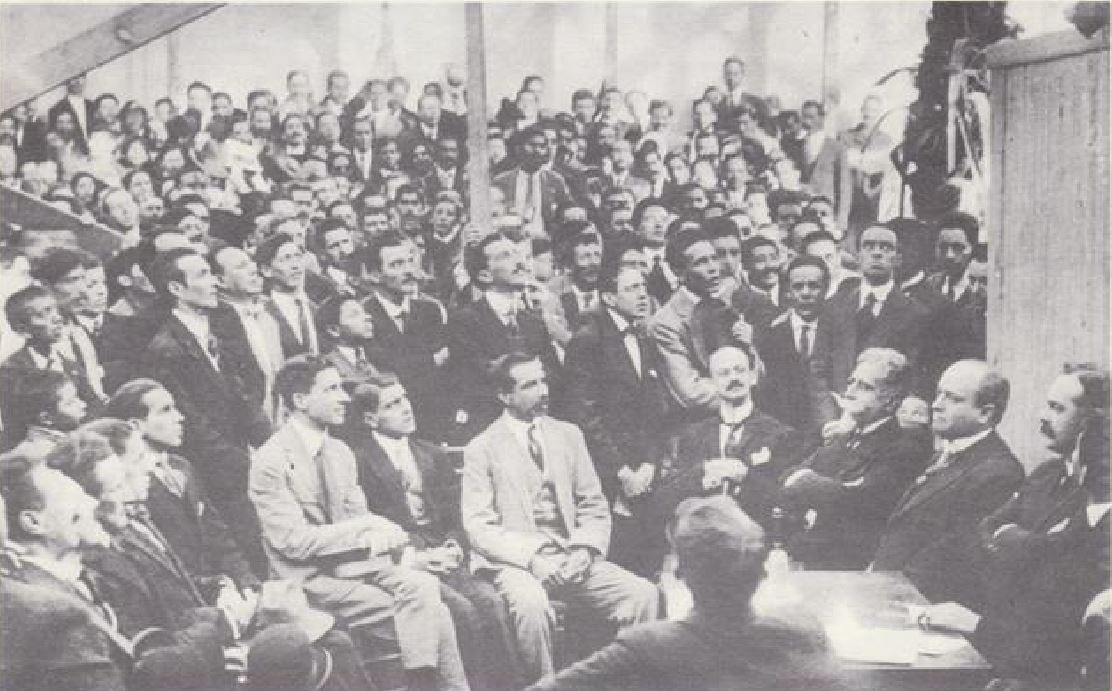
"People's House" in December 1919, when the "Three-fold Act" was signed. Sitting down in forefront are the leaders of the Conservative Party of Guatemala.

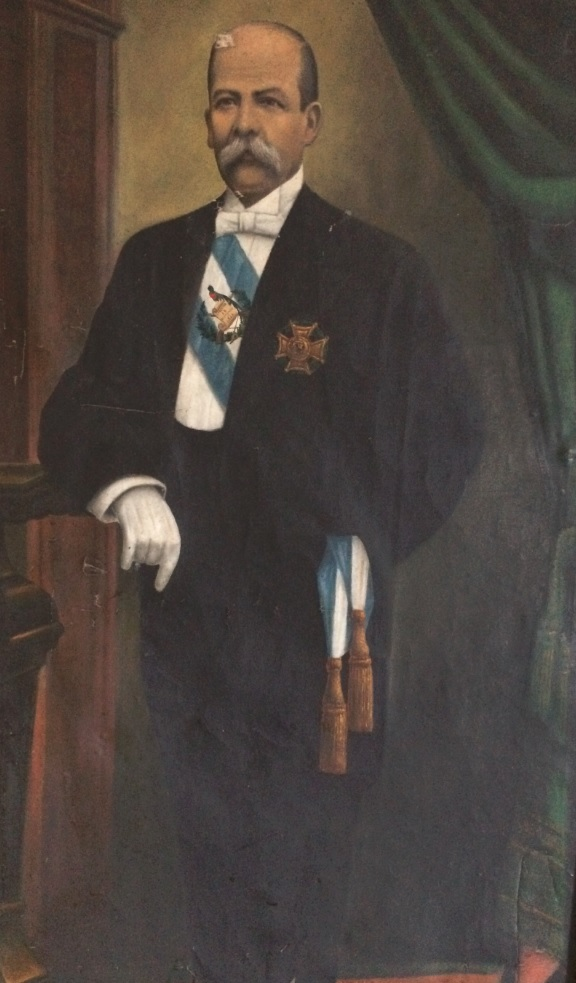
President Estrada Cabrera official portrait during his last presidential term.

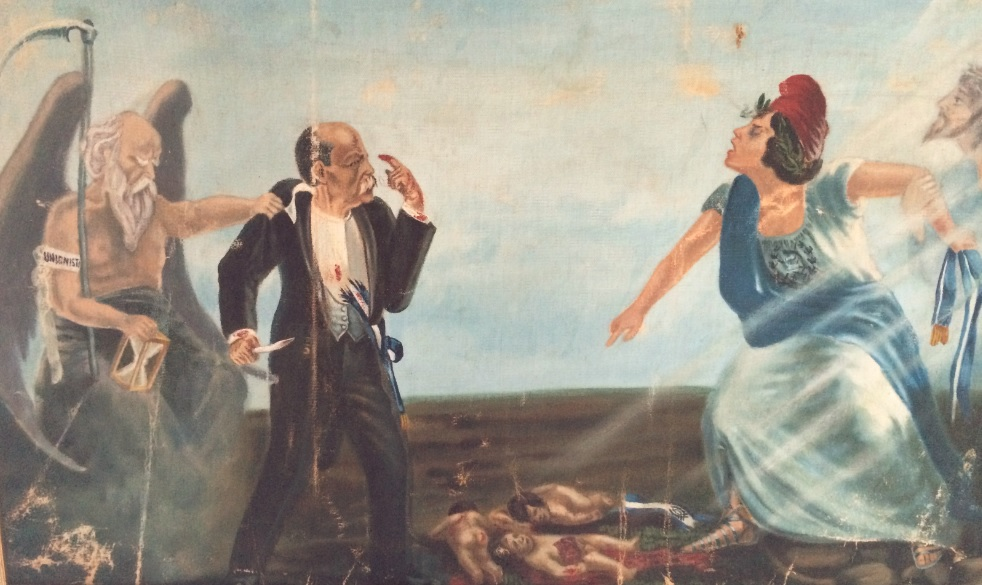
Cabrera's time has come: the Unionist Party takes him away after he has slaughtered Guatemala's children, while Christ reminds Guatemala that she has to forgive.

Opposition to his regime started after the 1917–1918 earthquakes as it was evident that the President was incapable of leading the recovery efforts. Bishop of Facelli, Piñol y Batres from the Aycinena family, began preaching against the government policies in the San Francisco Church in 1919, instructed by his cousin, Manuel Cobos Batres. For the first time, the Catholic Church opposed the President. (Note: The Catholic Church at the time was very weak and had only the secular clergy left; regular clergy orders had been expelled from Guatemala in 1872 by the liberal regimes of Justo Rufino Barrios and did not come back to the country until after the coup against Jacobo Árbenz Guzmán in 1954.) Additionally, Cobos Batres was able to inflame the nationality sentiment of conservative leaders José Azmitia, Tácito Molina, Eduardo Camacho, Julio Bianchi and Emilio Escamilla into forming a Central America Unionist party and oppose the strong regime of Estrada Cabrera. The Unionist party began its activities with the support of several sectors of the Guatemala City society, among them the Universidad Estrada Cabrera students and the labor associations, who under the leadership of Silverio Ortiz founded the Patriotic Labor Committee.

The new party was called "Unionist", to differentiate it from both the Liberal and Conservative parties and therefore be able to appeal all "good willing, freedom and democracy loving" men who "dreamed of the Central America Union". The headquarters of the new party were in a house belonging to the Escamilla family which soon was known as "People's House". Tácito Molina wrote a founding Act for the party, which was signed by fifty one citizens on 25 December 1919 and was later known as the "Three-fold Act" because it had to be folded in three when it was distributed to the citizens of the city. The document was distributed in Guatemala City until 1 January 1920.

Estrada Cabrera was forced to accept the new party due to the internal and international pressure. On 1 March 1920, the National Assembly officially accepted the new party. Since then, Estrada Cabrera publicly admitted his willingness to accept the international opinion on opening spaces for political rivals, but kept arresting Unionist sympathizers. On 11 March 1920, the new party organized a large demonstration against the government, but the army fired into the crowd, fomenting more resentment and anger which further united the Guatemalan people against the President.

The National Assembly, whose president then was Adrián Vidaurre, former Secretary of War and one of the most important members of Cabrera's cabinet, declared the President unable to continue and designated Carlos Herrera y Luna as interim president. Cabrera resisted this designation and settled for a fight from his residence in "La Palma", until he was defeated in April, following the "Tragic Week" during which Guatemala was in a state of revolution against the regime, and armed Unionists fought Cabrera's soldiers in the streets. Estrada Cabrera finally surrendered on 14 April 1920, along with his loyal friend, Peruvian poet José Santos Chocano.

Estrada Cabrera’s downfall had quite a unique conclusion without the involvement of the United States. Overall, American interests where no longer considering Estrada Cabrera as a suitable patron, especially American companies such as the United Fruit Company. It was unusual at the time for the United States to turn their back on Estrada Cabrera, as U.S. representation usually acted as a "kingmaker" in the words of James R. Handy.

It was believed that one of the reasons that led to Estrada Cabrera not receiving any support from the U.S. was due to Guatemala's lack of involvement during the First World War. The U.S. requested that the Estrada Government restrict the large German-Guatemalan population, which held several assets connected to coffee as explained by Ralph Lee Woodward. Cabrera did very little when it came down to seizing these German-owned businesses and reselling them to American companies. One of the German-owned businesses to have been seized was the Empresa Eléctrica del Sur, which was later sold to an American business called Henry W. Catlin’s Electric Lighting Company in 1885.

Semana Trágica (Tragic week, April 1920)

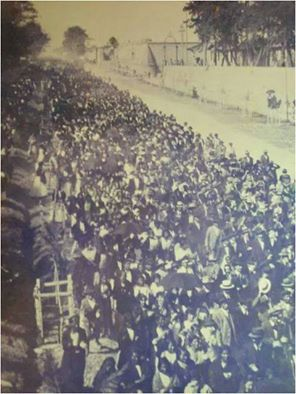
Unionist party massive demonstration on 11 March 1920. After ordering the army to attack the unarmed protestors Estrada Cabrera's regime started to crack.

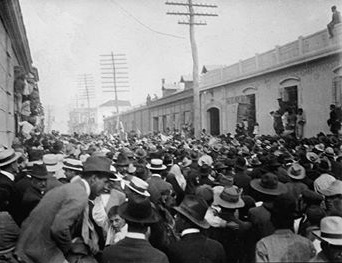
Massive attendance on the city streets during Tragic Week.

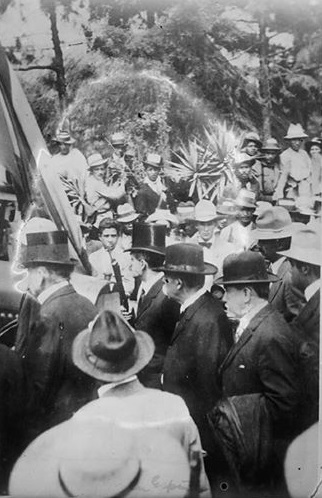
Estrada Cabrera leaves La Palma after surrendering. He is surrounded by the Diplomats from several countries and Peruvian poet José Santos Chocano.

Imágenes de los acontecimientos de la «Semana Trágica», que se desarrollaron cuando Estrada Cabrera no aceptó su destitución y empezó a atacar la ciudad desde su residencia en La Palma. Los combates continuaron hasta el 14 de abril, en que finalmente se rindió el presidente.
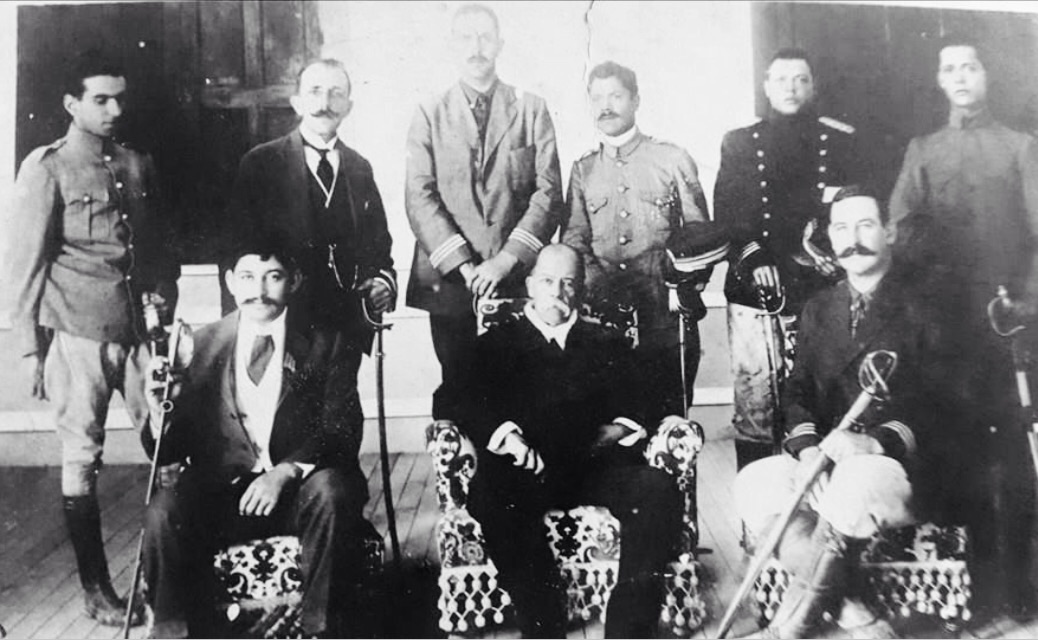
With his Army Staff the day after his resignation.

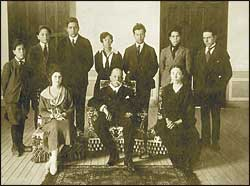
With family and children after his resignation.

=== His loyal adherents until the end ===
The people whose portraits are shown here were captured along Estrada Cabrera after he surrendered in La Palma or were killed during the Tragic Week events. There are, according to the number written on their picture: 1. Manuel Estrada Cabrera; 2. Lieutenant colonel Eduardo Anguiano: killed in combat.; 3. Juan Viteri: Cabrera loyal assassin. He was the son of Juan Viteri, whom Cabrera had killed in 1908 along to his brother Adolfo; he was in prison several years and once he was released he became a loyal servant to the president.; 4. General J. Antonio Aguilar: police chief of Antigua Guatemala. Died in prison on 10 May 1920.; 5. Manuel Echeverría y Vidaurre: one of the president aides. He was the only one that was able to flee the country.; 6. Máximo Soto Hall: wealthy poet and politician that spent most of the Estrada Cabrera years writing in his honor.; 7. Col. Miguel López -Col. "Milpas Altas"-: Matamoros Fort commander. He was in charge of bombing Guatemala City during the Tragic Week and was lynched by an angry mob in the Central Square on 15 April 1920.; 8. Col. Salvador Alarcón: Totonicapán commander. Died in that department on 10 May 1920.; 9. Franco Gálvez Portocarrero: Estrada Cabrera aide and unconditional servant. Was lynched in the Central Square on 16 April 1920.; 10. Lieutenant colonel Roderico Anzueto: in 1908 he was one of the cadets that denounced his classmates to the government when they tried to kidnap the President. After he was released from prison he rejoined the Army and was Police Chief of president Jorge Ubico Castañeda.; 11. Alberto García Estrada: Matamoros Fort second commander who also coordinator the city bombing. Lynched in Central Square on 15 April 1920.; 12. José Félix Flores, Jr.: Eduardo Anguiano friend 13. José Félix Flores: died in combat on 13 April 1920.; 14. Luis Fontaine: French citizen. He was a servant of the President and died in combat on 10 April 1920.; 15. Mayor José María Mirón: died on 15 April 1920.; 16. Mayor Emilio Méndez: Prison director. Died in combat in Chimaltenango on 10 April 1920.; 17. Ricardo Sánchez: a relative to the President; 18. Gregorio González: second Police chief. He was killed by his own on 9 April 1920.; 19. Mayor Julio Ponce: died in combat on 8 April 1920.
Other close collaborators were: 1. Manuel Estrada Cabrera; 2. General José Reyes: Chief of Staff during the Tragic Week; 3. General J. Claro Chajón: Army Commander in Chief and coordinator of the attacks on Guatemala City during the Tragic Week; 4. Col. Rafael Yaquián: Urban Police chief 5. Gorge I. Galán: Secret Police chief 6. José Santos Chocano: Peruvian poet and close friend of the President; 7. General Miguel Larrave: Mazatenango Army commander 8. Brigadier Juan P.F. Padilla: La Palma defense commander 9. J. Sotero Segura Alfaro: secret police agent 10. Manuel María Girón: Government official 11. Jesús F. Sáenz: President first secretary 12. Col. Angel Santis: friend of the President; 13. Felipe Márquez: Estrada Cabrera secret agent 14. Gerardo Márquez: son of Felipe Marquez and a convicted felon for murder 15. Col. Manuel de León Arriaga: Army artillery second commander 16. Gilberto Mancilla: coronel Eduardo Anguiano aide 17. Col. José Pineda Chavarría: Post Office director 18. Heberto Correa: university student and secret police undercover agent 19. Lieutenant colonel Carlos de León Régil: police officer 20. Andrés Largaespada: writer who defended the President in the newspapers 21. Brigadier Enrique Aris: secret police agent

== Death ==
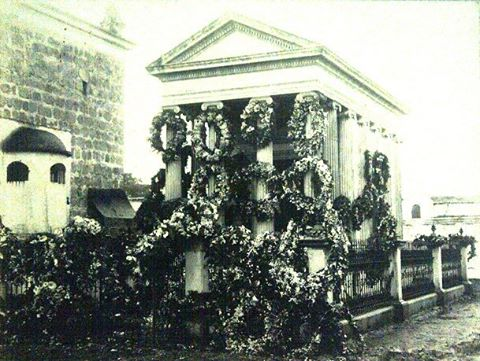
Tomb of Estrada Cabrera after his passing in 1924.

Estrada Cabrera was sent to prison for life after he was deposed. He died after a few years, in 1924, and was laid to rest in Quetzaltenango.

== Legacy ==
=== Minerva celebrations ===
Minerva Temples

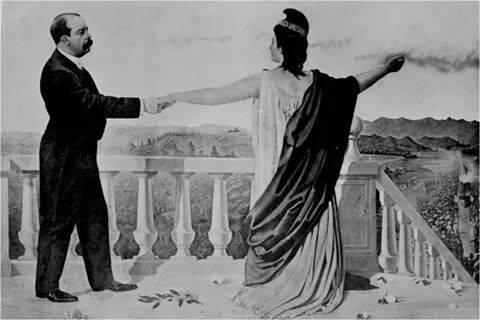
Greek goddess Athena -Minerva- congratulates Estrada Cabrera on his accomplishments with his "Minervalias". Painting from c. 1905.

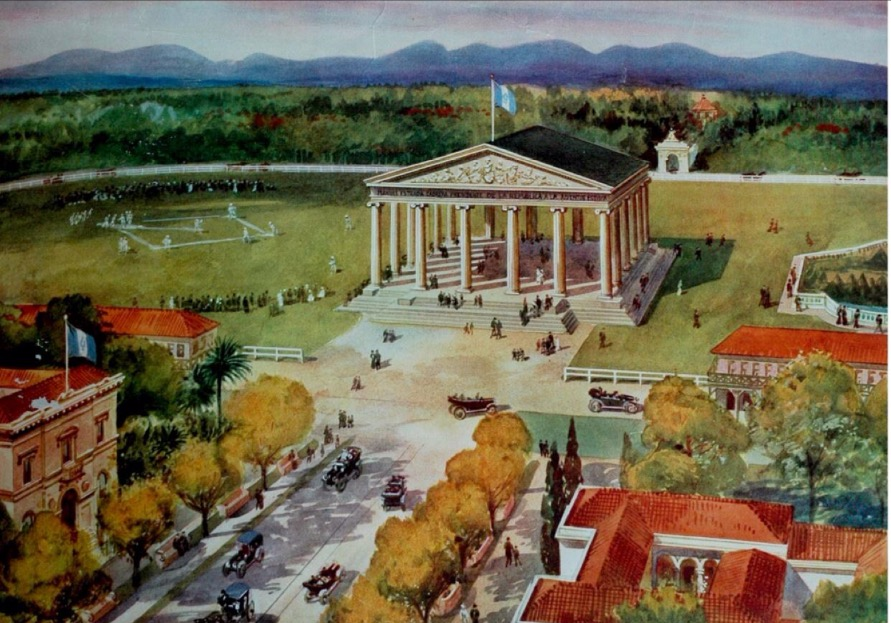
View of North Hippodrome: Simeón Cañas Avenue, Baseball Stadium and Minerva Temple, 1915.

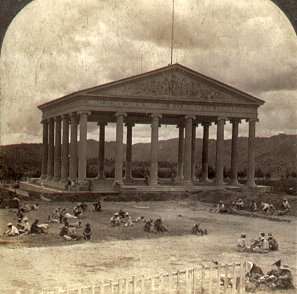
Estrada's Temple of Minerva, Guatemala City, c. 1905. The architrave is inscribed: Manuel Estrada Cabrera Presidente de la República a la Juventud Estudiosa (Note: Translation: "Manuel Estrada Cabrera, President of the Republic, to the Studious Youth"). This structure was later demolished during the government of Arbenz in the early years of the 1950s, but similar temples in Quetzaltenango and other cities still stand.)

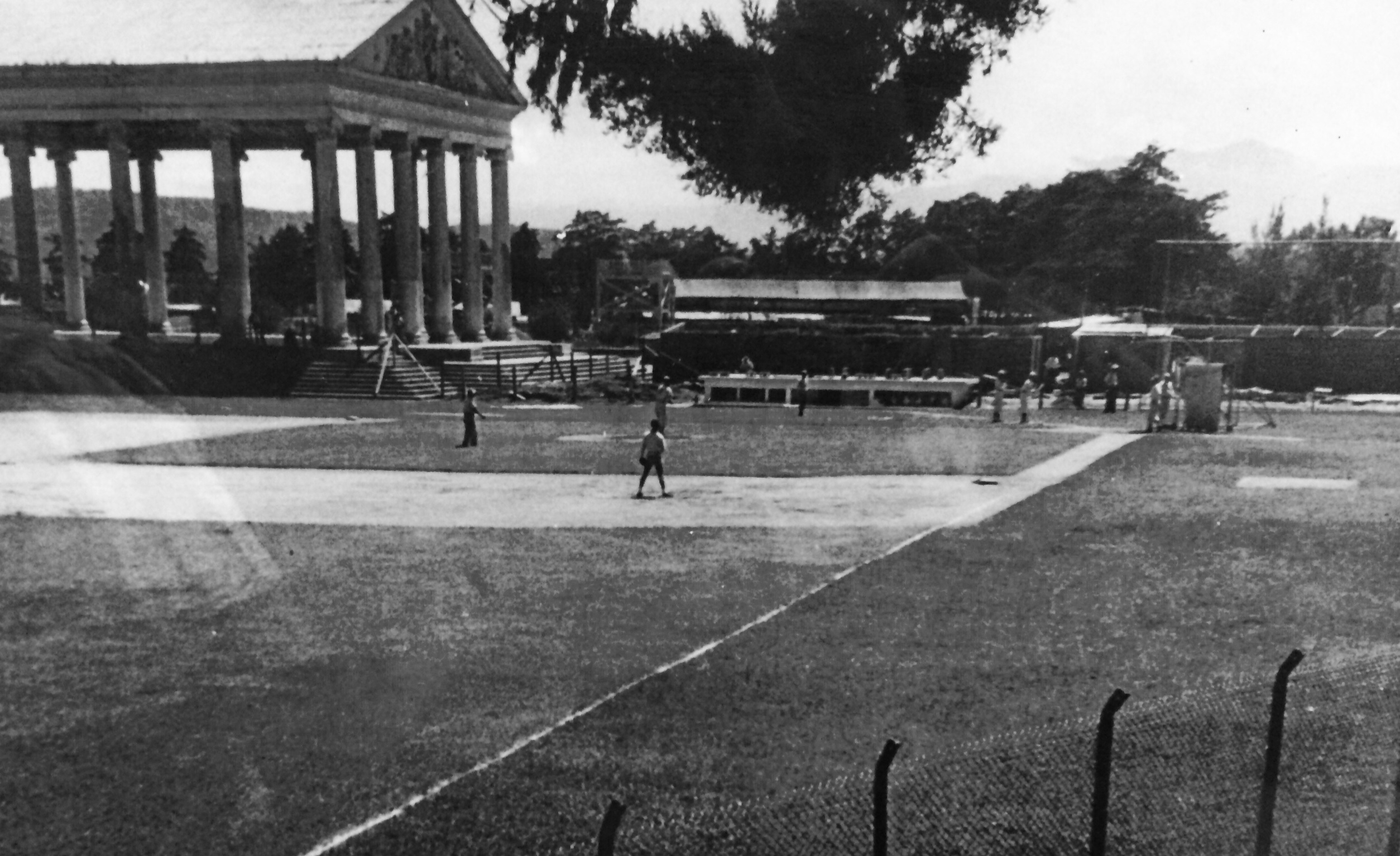
Baseball Stadium Enrique Torrebiarte (then Minerva Stadium) before stands construction.

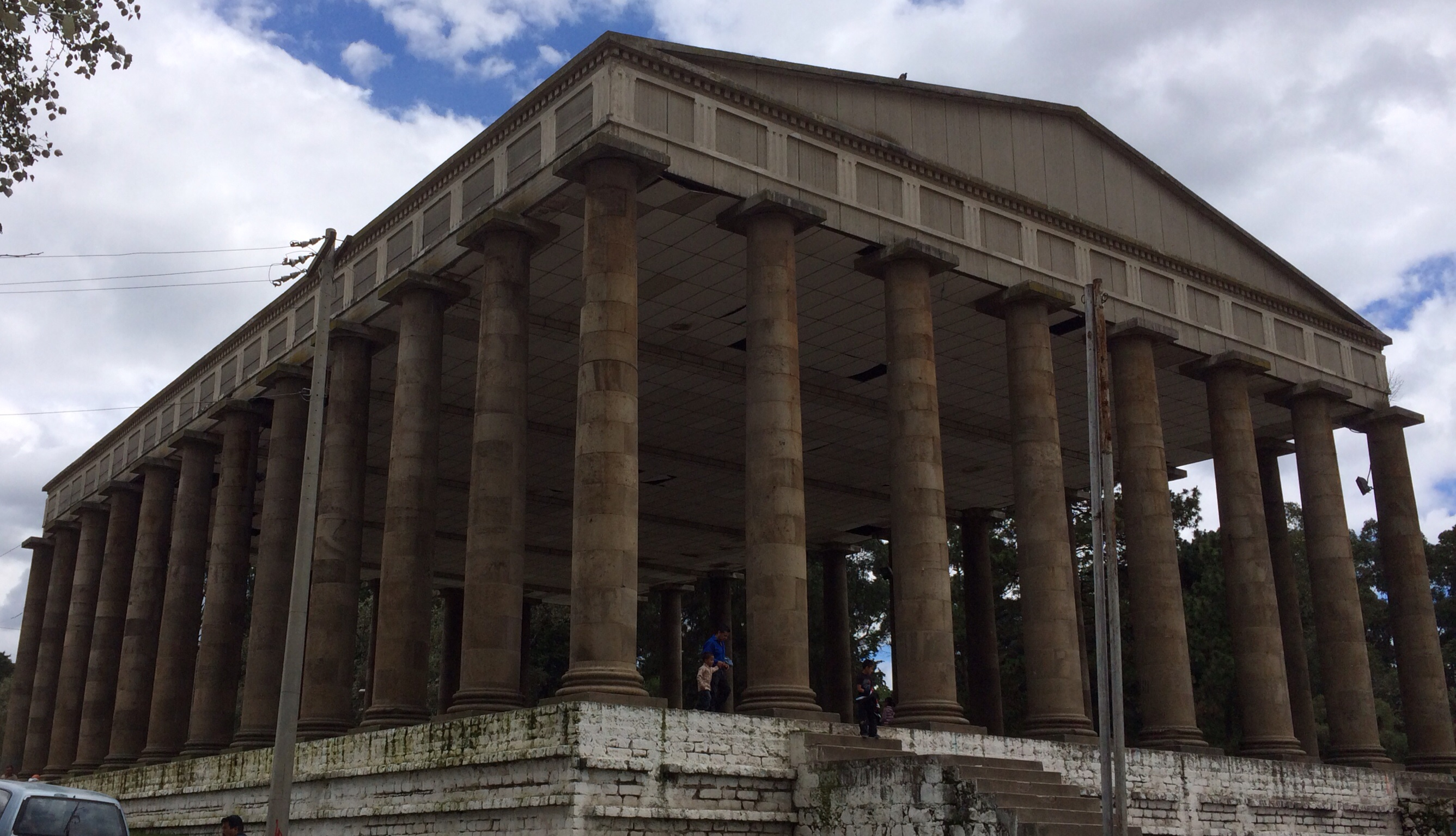
Quetzaltenango Temple in 2014.
Note the decay and that any Estrada Cabrera reference has been removed.

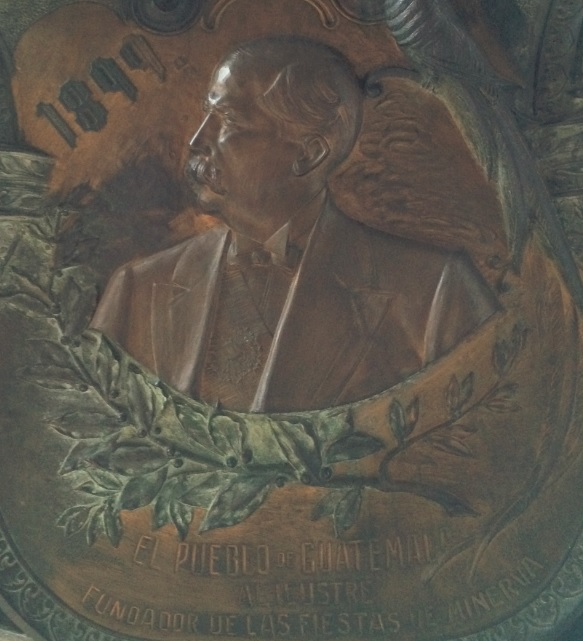
Estrada Cabrera Medallion, in recognition of the fifteenth anniversary of the Minerva Celebrations.

Estrada's most curious legacy was his attempt to foster a cult of Minerva in Guatemala: Early in his reign he indicated interest in education and in 1899 he initiated feasts of Minerva, celebrating accomplishments of students and teachers based on an idea of his Secretary of Infrastructure, Rafael Spinola. Estrada Cabrera ordered the construction of a Hellenic style "Temples of Minerva" in Guatemala City, and a few years later all major cities of the country had their own, sponsored by the local tax payers. In the temples, Estrada Cabrera celebrated the "Fiestas Minervalias" for studious youth.

He extended roads, and the long-delayed railway from the Atlantic coast to Guatemala City was completed in 1908, although his achievements were overshadowed by growing repression and blatant graft, including bribes for the president. The lot of native workers was little better than peonage, and everywhere there was surveillance to report subversive activities.

== In fiction ==
Estrada Cabrera was immortalized in the dictator novel El Señor Presidente (1946), written by Nobel laureate Miguel Ángel Asturias. Although the most famous, this is not the only book written about him: Rafael Arevalo Martinez wrote a book on his life, government and overthrow called Ecce Pericles, and Carlos Wyld Ospina wrote El Autócrata, a bitter biography of the president.

The role that UFCO played in Guatemala during the Estrada Cabrera and Jorge Ubico regimes is described in three novels from Miguel Ángel Asturias called The Banana Trilogy: Viento Fuerte, El Papa Verde, and Los Ojos de los Enterrados.

== See also ==
- Dictator novel
- History of Guatemala
- Presidents of Guatemala

== Notes and references ==
=== Bibliography ===
- Arévalo Martínez, Rafael (1945). ¡Ecce Pericles! (in Spanish). Guatemala: Tipografía Nacional.
- Barrios Vital, Jenny Ivette (2006). Restauración y revitalización del complejo arquitectónico de la Recolección (PDF) (Thesis) (in Spanish). Guatemala: Tesis de la Universidad de San Carlos de Guatemala.
- Bascome Jones, J.; Scoullar, William T.; Soto Hall, Máximo (1915). El Libro azul de Guatemala (in Spanish). Searcy & Pfaff. "Relato é historia sobre la vida de las personas más prominentes; historia condensada de la república; artículos especiales sobre el comercio, agricultura y riqueza mineral, basado sobre las estadísticas oficiales."
- Castellanos, Lorena (2014). "Vida y obra de José María Reyna Barrios". Universidad Francisco Marroquín (in Spanish). Guatemala.
- Caverbel, Louis (1918). "Au Guatemala". L'Illustration (in French) (3906). París, France.
- Chapman, Peter (2007). Bananas: How the United Fruit Company Shaped the World. NY: Canongate.
- de Aerenlund, C. (2006). Voyage to an Unknown Land: The saga of an Italian Family from Lombardy to Guatemala. Xlibris Corporation. ISBN 1-4257-0187-6.
- De los Ríos, Efraín (1948). Ombres contra Hombres (in Spanish). México: Fondo de Cultura de la Universidad de México.
- Diario de Centro América (1918). "Cobertura del cataclismo". Diario de Centro América (in Spanish). Guatemala: Tipografía La Unión.
- — (21 April 1908). "Otro criminal atentado contra la persona del benemérito presidente de la República". Diario de Centro América (in Spanish). Guatemala.
- — (2012). "Historia del Diario de Centro América" (PDF). Foro red boa (in Spanish). Archived from the original (PDF) on 20 July 2014.
- — (4 June 1907). "Informe de la autopsia de los perpetradores del criminal atentado contra la persona del Presidente de la Reública". Diario de Centro América (in Spanish). Guatemala: Tipografía Unión.
- Dosal, Paul J. (1993). Doing Business with the Dictators: A Political History of United Fruit in Guatemala. Wilmington, Delaware: Scholarly Resources Inc.
- El Guatemalteco (22 February 1907a). "Decretos del Organismo Ejecutivo". El Guatemalteco; diario oficial de la República de Guatemala, en la América Central (in Spanish). Guatemala.
- — (2 May 1907b). "Decretos del organismo ejecutivo". El Guatemalteco; Diario Oficial de la República de Guatemala, en la América Central (in Spanish). Guatemala.
- — (8 May 1907c). "Decretos del organismo legislativo". El Guatemalteco; Diario Oficial de la República de Guatemala, en la América Central (in Spanish). Guatemala.
- — (22 March 1907d). "Decretos del organismo legislativo". El Guatemalteco, Diario Oficial de la República de Guatemala, en la América Central (in Spanish). Guatemala.
- — (29 April 1907e). "Decretos del organismo ejecutivo". El Guatemalteco, Diario Oficial de la República de Guatemala, en la América Central (in Spanish). Guatemala.
- Gamboa, Federico (1934). "Mi diario" (in Spanish). México: Ediciones Botas.
- Gómez C., Enrique (1898). "Upcoming presidential elections". La idea liberal (in Spanish). Guatemala: Guatemala.
- — (1898). "Manuel Estrada Cabrera" (in Spanish). Guatemala: Síguere & Co.
- Himelblau, Jack (1973). "El Señor Presidente: Antecedents, Sources and Reality". Hispanic Review. 40 (1): 43–78. doi:10.2307/471873. JSTOR 471873. "JSTOR requires subscription"
- Mendoza, Juan Manuel (1946). Biografía de Enrique Gómez Carrillo: su vida, su obra y su época (in Spanish) (2nd ed.). Guatemala: Tipografía Nacional.
- Montenegro, Gustavo Adolfo (2005). "Yo, el Supremo". Revista Domigo de Prensa Libre (in Spanish). Archived from the original on 6 October 2014.
- Ortiz Rivas, Silverio (1922). Reseña histórica de la parte que el elemento obrero tuvo en el Partido Unionista (in Spanish). Guatemala: Unpublished. "Parts of this book are reproduced in ¡Ecce Pericles! of Rafael Arévalo Martínez"
- Pérez Verdía, Luis (1914). "Revolución y Régimen Constitucionalista. Documento 521. Informe del Sr. Luis Pérez Verdía rendido al Canciller Huertista". Archived from the original on 19 July 2014.
- Prins Wilhelm (1922). Between two continents, notes from a journey in Central America, 1920. London, UK: E. Nash and Grayson, Ltd. pp. 148–209.
- Torres Espinoza, Enrique (2007). Enrique Gómez Carrillo, el cronista errante (in Spanish) (2nd ed.). Guatemala: Artemis-Edinter.
- Unión Tipográfica (1920). "Principales jefes del Cabrerismo" (in Spanish). Guatemala: Unión Tipográfica.
- Vidaurre, Adrián (1921). Los últimos treinta años pasados de la vida política de Guatemala (in Spanish). La Habana, Cuba: Imprenta Sainz, Arca y Cía.

Preceded by José María Reina	President of Guatemala; 1898–1920	Succeeded by Carlos Herrera
