= Los Amates =

- Municipality of Guatemala
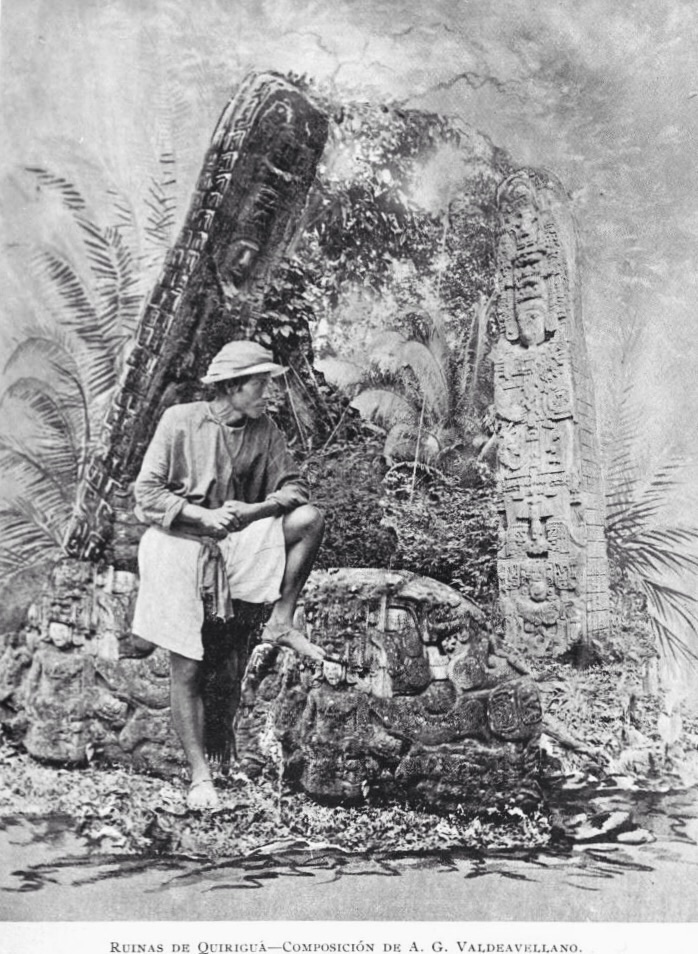
- Quiriguá, Los Amates, in 1897. Picture from Alberto G. Valdeavellano

- Location in Guatemala
- Coordinates: 15°16′00″N 89°06′00″W
- Country: Guatemala
- Department: Izabal Department
- Settled: 30 June 1916

Government
  - Mayor (2016-2020): Milton Panteleón

Area
  - Total: 405 sq mi (1,049 km^{2})
- Elevation: 253 ft (77 m)

Population (2018 census)
  - Total: 60,914
  - Density: 150.4/sq mi (58.07/km^{2})
- Time zone: GMT_6
- Climate: Am

Los Amates is a municipality in the Izabal department of Guatemala. At the 2018 census, the population was 60,914. The mayor is currently Marco Tulio Ramirez Estrada. Los Amates is located on the Motagua River, 6 kilometres (3.7 mi) from the ruins of the ancient Maya city of Quiriguá.

== History ==
=== Quiriguá ===
Quiriguá is an ancient Maya archaeological site in Los Amates. It is a medium-sized site covering approximately 3 square kilometres (1.2 sq mi) along the lower Motagua River, with the ceremonial center about 1 km (0.6 mi) from the north bank. During the Maya Classic Period (AD 200–900), Quiriguá was situated at the juncture of several important trade routes. The site was occupied by 200, construction on the acropolis had begun by about 550, and an explosion of grander construction started in the 8th century. All construction had halted by about 850, except for a brief period of reoccupation in the Early Postclassic (c. 900 – c. 1200). Quiriguá shares its architectural and sculptural styles with the nearby Classic Period city of Copán, with whose history it is closely entwined.

=== After the Independence of Central America ===
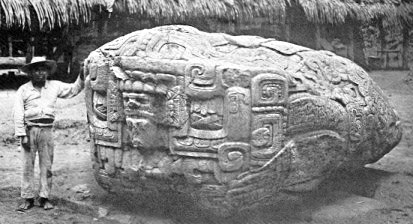
Zoomorph B – photo by Maudslay

The area was largely abandoned during the Spanish Colony of Guatemala, and the first European visitor to publish an account of Los Amates was English architect and artist Frederick Catherwood, who reached the Quiriguá ruins in 1840, during the turbulent times of president general Rafael Carrera. The previous landowner, by the surname of Payés, had related the existence of the ruins to his sons and to Carlos Meiney, a Jamaican Englishman resident in Guatemala. The elder Payés had recently died and passed the land to his sons and, since neither Meiney nor Payés' sons had visited the land containing the ruins, they invited John Lloyd Stephens and Catherwood to join them on their first trip to the site. Stephens had other duties to attend to, but Catherwood was able to accompany the Payés brothers to Quiriguá. Due to adverse conditions he was only able to stay a short time at the ruins, but made drawings of two of the stelae, which were published with a short account of Catherwood's visit in John Lloyd Stephens's book Incidents of Travel in Central America, Chiapas, and Yucatan in 1841. A longer account of the ruins was made in 1854 by Dr. Karl Scherzer.

Explorer and archaeologist Alfred Maudslay visited Quiriguá for three days in 1881; they were the first pre-Columbian ruins that he saw and they were sufficiently impressive to inspire him to take up a permanent interest in Central American archaeology. He was able to return on three further occasions, the last being in 1894, and he made the first efforts to clear the monuments before recording them. He carried out a very thorough examination and made a photographic record of all visible monuments, carried out some minor excavations, made paper and plaster molds of the hieroglyphic inscriptions and surveyed the principal sculptures; these molds were then shipped to the Victoria and Albert Museum, with casts being transferred to the British Museum.

=== Los Amates train station ===
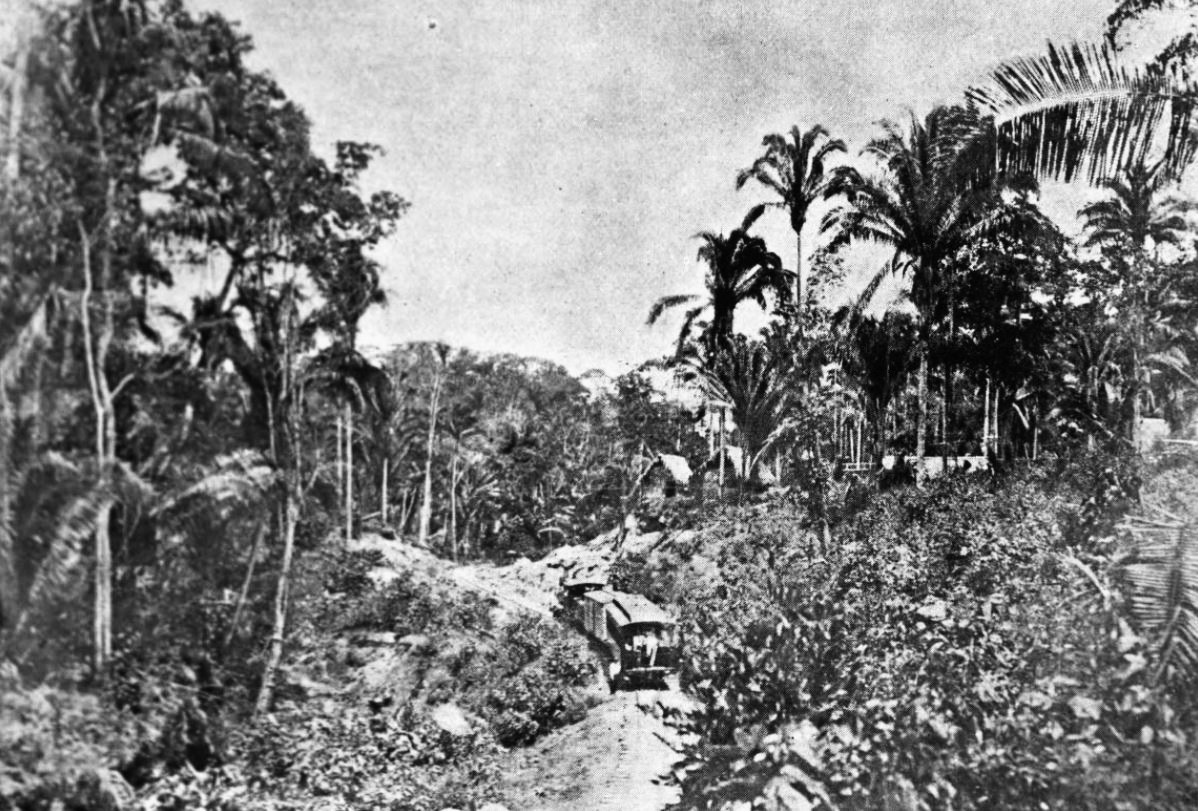
Railways through the jungle in Izabal Department in 1896. Photographs by La Ilustración Guatemalteca.

On 22 November 1896 the Northern Railroad Zacapa, Zacapa-Puerto Barrios connection, was opened to the public; it was the most important infrastructure project of general José María Reina Barrios given the economic crisis the loomed over Guatemala if he was not able to finish the railroad on time for the Central American Expo schedule for March 1897. The new line would have one hundred and one miles. In those days, the Northern region of Guatemala was practically a new and unexplored area, a newfound place where natural resources could be exploited and the railroad construction finally gave way to the commercial and industrial exploration of the area. The complete line Puerto Barrios-Guatemala City -through Panajax- had one hundred and ninety seven miles and was built in stages (which later became train stops): from Puerto Barrios to Tenedores, eighteen miles; from Tenedores to Los Amates, forty one miles; from Los Amates to Gualán, twenty one miles; from Zacapa to El Rancho de San Agustín, thirty four miles; from El Rancho to Panajax, thirty miles; and finally, from Panajax to Guatemala city, thirty two miles.

In 1910, the United Fruit Company bought Quiriguá, Los Amates and all the land for a great distance around for banana production; they set aside 75 acres (30 ha) around the ceremonial centre as an archaeological park, leaving an island of jungle among the plantations. More archaeological work was carried out from 1910 to 1914 by Edgar Lee Hewett and Sylvanus Morley for the School of American Archaeology in Santa Fe. Duplicates of the stelae of Quiriguá made from Hewitt's plaster casts of the originals were exhibited at the Panama–California Exposition in San Diego, California, in 1915. The casts are still on display at the San Diego Museum of Man in their "Maya: Heart of Sky, Heart of Earth" exhibition. The Carnegie Institution conducted several intermittent projects at Quiriguá from 1915 through 1934.

=== Municipality establishment ===
Los Amates municipality was established by an executive action of president Manuel Estrada Cabrera on 30 June 1916, and ratified and organized on 24 June 1920. On 28 January 1944 the municipality capital was moved to Quirigua, but the change was brief as it was derogated on 12 April of that year.

=== United Fruit Company ===
In early 1920, after the Unionist party deposed Manuel Estrada Cabrera, the United Fruit Company -which had received considerable concessions from the Guatemalan president in the past two decades in Izabal- was suddenly confronted with a large strike and did not have the help from the government to repress it due to the fighting taking place in Guatemala City. New labor chapters opened both in Morales and Los Amates banana plantations, while Puerto Barrios had more than 250 members. The strike grew stronger and upon the resistance of the Unionists to help it, UFCO supported a coup d'état led by general José María Orellana in 1921, who swiftly repressed the union members and gave tranquility to the United Fruit Company operations in Izabal.

=== Franja Transversal del Norte ===
In the 1960s, the importance of the region known as Franja Transversal del Norte was in livestock, exploitation of precious export wood and archaeological wealth. Timber contracts we granted to multinational companies such as Murphy Pacific Corporation from California, which invested US$30 million for the colonization of southern Petén and Alta Verapaz, and formed the North Impulsadora Company. Colonization of the area was made through a process by which inhospitable areas of the Franja Transversal del Norte (FTN) were granted to native peasants.

In 1964, the National Institute for Agrarian Transformation (INTA) defined the geography of the FTN as the northern part of the departments of Huehuetenango, Quiché, Alta Verapaz and Izabal and that same year priests of the Maryknoll order and the Order of the Sacred Heart began the first process of colonization, along with INTA, carrying settlers from Huehuetenango to the Ixcán sector in Quiché.

The Northern Transversal Strip was officially created during the government of General Carlos Arana Osorio in 1970, by Decree 60-70 in the Congress, for agricultural development. The area included within the municipalities: San Ana Huista, San Antonio Huista, Nentón, Jacaltenango, San Mateo Ixtatán, and Santa Cruz Barillas in Huehuetenango; Chajul and San Miguel Uspantán in Quiché; Cobán, Chisec, San Pedro Carchá, Lanquín, Senahú, Cahabón and Chahal, in Alta Verapaz and the entire department of Izabal.

== Climate ==
Los Amates has a tropical monsoon climate (Köppen: Am) and its municipal capital is 78 m above sea level.

Climate data for Los Amates
Month	Jan	Feb	Mar	Apr	May	Jun	Jul	Aug	Sep	Oct	Nov	Dec	Year
Mean daily maximum °C (°F)	28.1 (82.6)	29.7 (85.5)	32.0 (89.6)	33.3 (91.9)	33.3 (91.9)	32.6 (90.7)	31.3 (88.3)	32.0 (89.6)	32.2 (90.0)	30.8 (87.4)	28.7 (83.7)	28.1 (82.6)	31.0 (87.8)
Daily mean °C (°F)	23.9 (75.0)	24.7 (76.5)	26.5 (79.7)	27.7 (81.9)	28.2 (82.8)	28.0 (82.4)	27.2 (81.0)	27.6 (81.7)	27.6 (81.7)	26.6 (79.9)	24.8 (76.6)	24.2 (75.6)	26.4 (79.6)
Mean daily minimum °C (°F)	19.8 (67.6)	19.7 (67.5)	21.1 (70.0)	22.1 (71.8)	23.2 (73.8)	23.4 (74.1)	23.2 (73.8)	23.2 (73.8)	23.1 (73.6)	22.4 (72.3)	21.0 (69.8)	20.3 (68.5)	21.9 (71.4)
Average precipitation mm (inches)	98 (3.9)	52 (2.0)	60 (2.4)	53 (2.1)	163 (6.4)	292 (11.5)	273 (10.7)	226 (8.9)	310 (12.2)	208 (8.2)	174 (6.9)	136 (5.4)	2,045 (80.6)
Source: Climate-Data.org

== See also ==
- Franja Transversal del Norte
- Izabal Department
- Quiriguá
- Tragic Week (Guatemala)
- United Fruit Company

== Notes and references ==
=== Bibliography ===
- Kelly, Joyce (1996). An Archaeological Guide to Northern Central America: Belize, Guatemala, Honduras, and El Salvador. Norman: University of Oklahoma Press. ISBN 0-8061-2858-5. OCLC 34658843.
- Solano, Luis (2012). Contextualización histórica de la Franja Transversal del Norte (FTN) (PDF) (in Spanish). Centro de Estudios y Documentación de la Frontera Occidental de Guatemala, CEDFOG. Archived from the original (PDF) on 13 November 2014.
