= Ricardo Casanova y Estrada =

19th and 20th-century Guatemalan Catholic bishop

The Most Reverend and the Most Illustrious Ricardo Castanova y Estrada
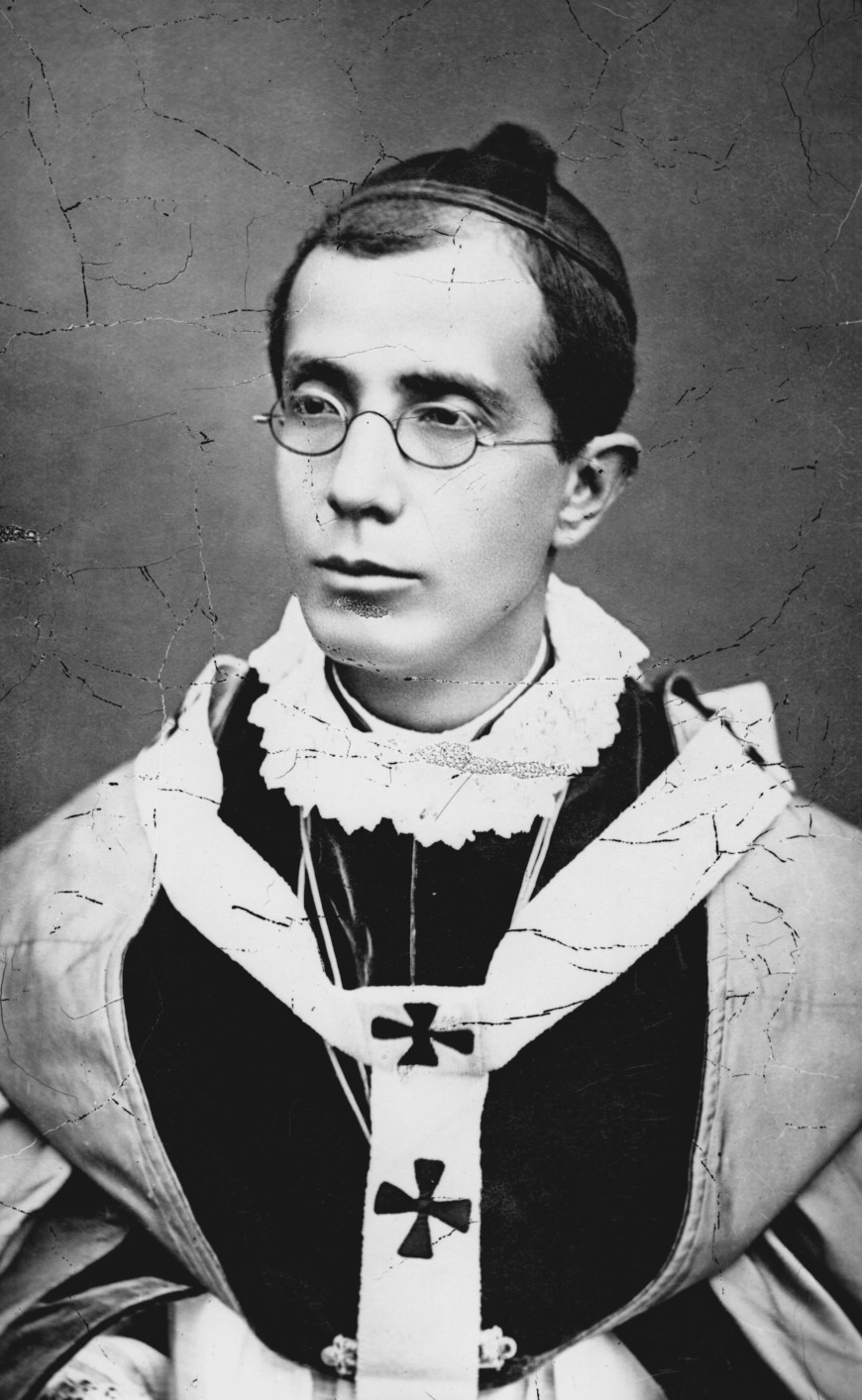
- Diocese: Santiago de Guatemala
- See: Cathedral of Guatemala City

Orders
- Ordination: September 21, 1875
- Consecration: 07:00, July 25, 1886

Personal details
- Born: November 10, 1844
- Died: April 14, 1913 Cantel, Quetzaltenango
- Motto: Crvces Salvs
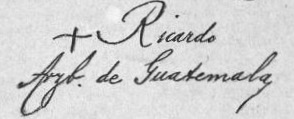
- Signature

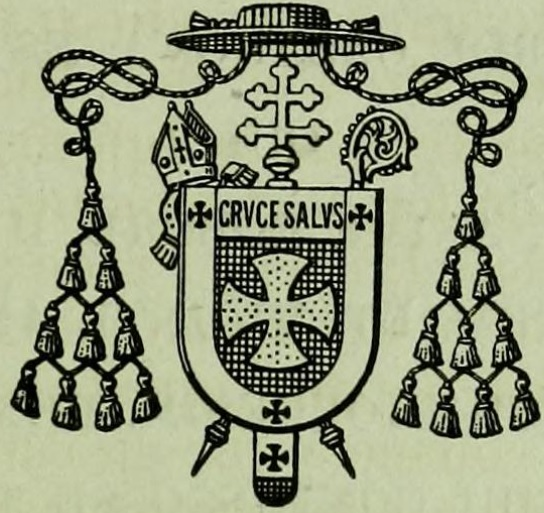
- Coat of arms

Ricardo Casanova y Estrada "The Great" (10 November 1844 – Cantel, Quetzaltenango, 14 April 1913) was a Guatemalan Catholic priest that became the eleventh Archbishop of Guatemala from 1886 to 1913. He had a role opposing president general Manuel Lisandro Barillas Bercián (1885-1896), who eventually expelled Casanova y Estrada from Guatemala. After a generous amnesty granted by president general José María Reina Barrios on 13 March 1897, the archbishop returned to Guatemala and was received by large crowds and joy.

== Biography ==
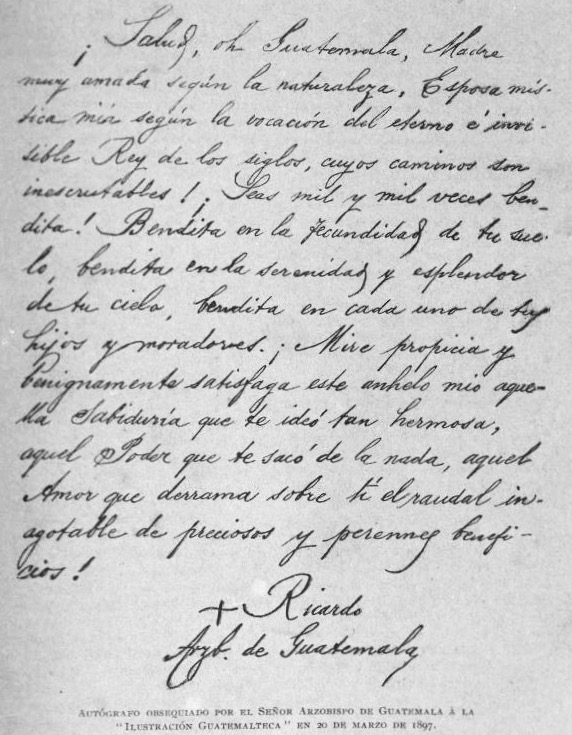
Letter sent by archbishop Casanova to the Guatemalan faithful upon his return to his country on 19 March 1897.

Casanova y Estrada was well educated, receiving private lessons with well-known Guatemalan writer and politician José Milla y Vidaurre during the 1860s; Ramón Rosa - a Honduran liberal politician and ideologist — was his classmate in those lectures with Milla and described Casanova y Estrada as one of the most distinguished young men of both Guatemala and its neighboring republics, as well as the most educated priest in Central America. Casanova y Estrada later studied in the Pontifica Universidad de San Carlos Borromeo where he studied again with Milla y Vidaurre and also with former Colombian president Mariano Espina, who was exiled in Guatemala. Among his classmates there were Marco Aurelio Soto, Ramón Rosa, (Note: Both Soto and Rosa would become the Public Instruction and Foreign Affairs secretaries of president Justo Rufino Barrios and eventually became president and prime minister of Honduras, respectively.) and Antonio Batres Jáuregui.

Casanova y Estrada was appointed Archbishop of Guatemala in 1886 and had a series of confrontations with president general Manuel Lisandro Barillas Bercián, who ended up expelling him from Guatemala.

=== Return from exile ===
While bishop Casanova y Estrada was exiled in Costa Rica, he expressed a very high regard about the Exposición Centroamericana which general José María Reina Barrios, was organizing at the time. In a pastoral message sent from San José, on 29 June 1896 Casanova y Estrada pointed out that the Expo would allow the government to reach to great goals: that Central American get to know among themselves much better and that the area products would be showcased to the rest of the world. After almost 10 years in exile, and coinciding with the 75th Central America Independence anniversary, Casanova y Estrada. Upon learnings about this, president Reina Barrios -who happened to be a high ranked Mason — realized the bishop's patriotism and presented an initiative to the National Assembly on its inaugural session of 1 March 1897 to allow his return to Guatemalan soil. On 13 March, Decree 351, allowing archbishop Casanova y Estrada to return to Guatemala, was approved.

The archbishop returned to Guatemala on 19 March 1897, along with Juan Paz. Upon arrival at Puerto San José in the ship "Newport", a large multitude was waiting for him and listened to a mass that was celebrated in his honor. Then, he boarded a train that took him to Guatemala City where an even larger crowd was waiting for him at the Central Station, and then accompanied him to his quarters at the Metropolitan Cathedral; there were people on top of roof and every single window across the way, who saluted Casanova y Estrada. Afterwards, a majestic Te Deum took place in the cathedral, which was completely crowded with representatives of Guatemalan society. Even the agnostic writers of La Ilustración Guatemalteca, such as A. Macías del Real, congratulated the archbishop and could not deny the large support that the Catholic Church had in Guatemala at the time.

=== Pneumonia attack in 1899 ===
Trying to get up to date with his diocese affairs after returning from exile, Casanova y Estrada on 8 March 1899 decided to visit San Juan Sacatepéquez, Quiché and Sololá. After Holy Week celebrations on 3 April 1899, he suffered a sudden pneumonia attack; he fell severely ill and by 27 April his life was endangered. However, he was able to recover, and by 1 September he went back on his diocesan duties.

== Death ==
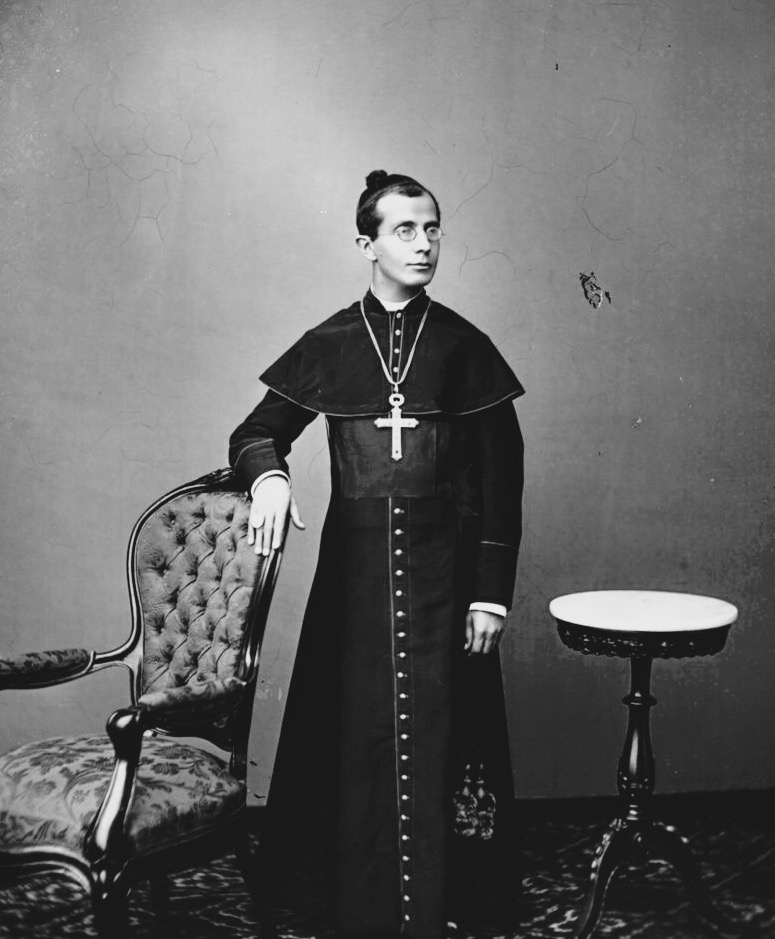
Archbishop Casanova y Estrada, ca. 1900. Photograph by Juan José de Jesús Yas.

During a visit to Quetzaltenango, Casanova y Estrada fell seriously ill in Santa Catarina Ixtahuacán parish and decided right there and then to return to Guatemala City immediately; he took the road of San Felipe, arriving at Cantel on 12 April 1913. There, he received medical attention, but around 11:00 pm on 13 April doctors realized there was no hope for him and he was given last rites. He died at 2:00 am on 14 April 1913.

After a few days while Casanova y Estrada's remains were transported back to Guatemala City and there were several ceremonies in his honor, he was buried in the Metropolitan Cathedral crypt, exactly below the Immaculate Conception altar, as he had wished. His tombstone simply reads: "Ricardo Casanova y Estrada, XI archbishop of Guatemala, 14 April 1913. Pray for him."

== Notes and references ==
=== Bibliography ===
- Barrientos, Alfonso Enrique (1948). "Ramón Rosa y Guatemala" (PDF). Revista del archivo y biblioteca nacionales (in Spanish). 27 (3–4). Honduras.
- Asociación de Amigos del País (2004). Diccionario Histórico-Biográfico de Guatemala (in Spanish). Guatemala: Amigos del País.
- Gobierno de Guatemala (1 August 1896). "Boletín de la Exposición Centro-Americana, 1 de agosto 1896". Boletín de la Exposición Centro-americana (in Spanish). Guatemala.
- Hernández de León, Federico (1930). El Libro de las Efemerides (in Spanish). Guatemala: Tipografía Sanchez y de Guise.
- Macías del Real, A. (1897). "El Arzobispo Ricardo Casanova y Estrada". La Ilustración Guatemalteca (in Spanish). I (17). Guatemala: Síguere, Guirola y Cía.
- Martínez Peláez, Severo (1990). La patria del criollo; ensayo de interpretación de la realidad colonial guatemalteca (in Spanish). México, D. F.: En Marcha.
- Prado, Ignacio (1913). Relación de las Exequias y Honras Fúnebres que se celebraron en esta S.I. Catedral por el alma del Ilmo. Y Rmo. Señor Arzobispo Metropolitano de Santiago de Guatemala Lic. Don Ricardo Casanova y Estrada en los días 16 y 17 de abril y 3 y 4 de junio de 1913 (in Spanish). Guatemala: Tipografía Sánchez y De Guise.
- Ramírez Colom, José M. (1907). Reseña biográfica del Ilustrísimo y Reverendísimo señor arzobispo de Santiago de Guatemala don Ricardo Casanova y Estrada (in Spanish). Guatemala: Sánchez y de Guise.
- Rosa, Ramón (15 September 1896) [15 October 1882]. "Don José Milla y Vidaurre". La Ilustración Guatemalteca (in Spanish). Guatemala: Síguere, Guirola y Cía.
