= Rafael Spinola =

Guatemalan politician, writer and public speaker

Rafael Spínola
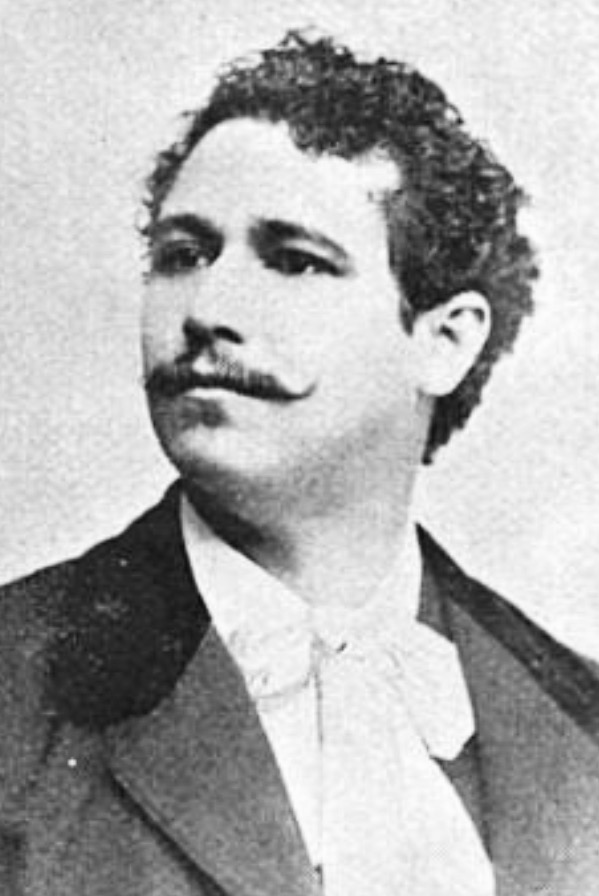

National Assembly representative
- In office 1893–1895
- President: José María Reina Barrios

Secretary of Infrastructure Republic of Guatemala
- In office 1899–1901
- President: Manuel Estrada Cabrera

Personal details
- Born: 1866
- Died: 4 October 1901 (aged 45) Guatemala City, Guatemala
- Party: Liberal
- Spouse: Florencia Strecker Frías
- Children: Stella and Magdalena Spínola (1896–1991)
- Education: Escuela Facultativa de Derecho y Notariado
- Occupation: politician, writer, public speaker
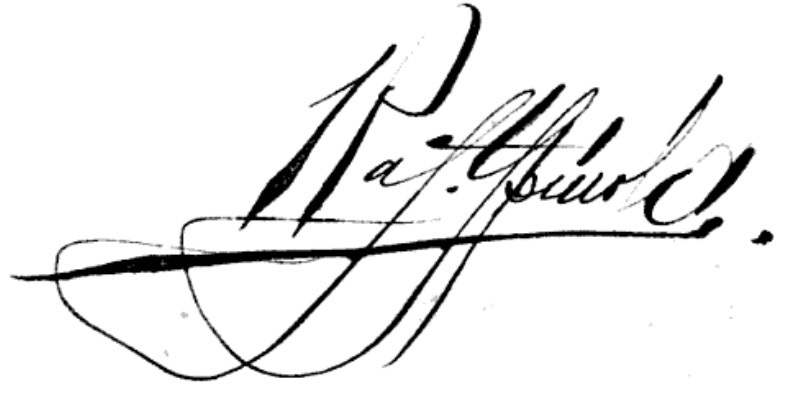
- Signature

Rafael Spínola (1866 – 4 October 1901 in Guatemala City) was a writer, journalist, politician and public speaker from Guatemala. Director of the well known cultura magazine La Ilustración Guatemalteca in 1896 and 1897, was Secretary of Infrastructure in Manuel Estrada Cabrera first presidential term. He also created the "Fiestas Minervalias", which were a celebration to the studious youth and the president Estrada Cabrera rule. He was also the one that signed the treaty granting the American company "The Central American Improvement Co. Inc." to finish the Northern Railroad, which had been left unfinished after president José María Reina Barrios assassination on 8 February 1898- which would be the stepping stone for the operations of the United Fruit Company in Guatemala. He was the father of Guatemalan poetesse Magdalena Spínola (1896–1991).

== Biography ==
=== Ancestors ===
Cavalry lieutenant colonel José María Espínola Baeza y Bravo arrived to Guatemala on 12 June 1822, in charge of six hundred men of the Mexican Army and under the command of Vicente Filísola. After Filísola returned to México the next year, colonel Espínola stayed in Guatemala because he met miss Mariana del Águila Escobar, whom he married and had three children with: José Vicente, Guadalupe and Mercedes Spínola del Águila. In Guatemala he changed his last name from Espínola to Spínola, which is the original spelling.

Rafael Spínola was son of José Vicente Spínola del Águila and Isabel Orellana Corzo, who in turn was the granddaughter of Venezuelan doctor Narciso Esparragoza y Gallardo, who graduated from the Real y Pontificia Universidad de San Carlos in 1794 and who became the first anatomy doctor in Guatemala by royal decree of King Charles IV.

=== Education ===
Spínola graduated high school from Instituto Nacional Central para Varones, where he was classmate of pioneer Guatemalan photographer Alberto G. Valdeavellano. In those years, he was known for his smart and sharp replies and jokes to his teachers, which made his classmates laugh without making the faculty angry. Strong and tall, he was also a vivacious and curious individual.

In 1885, after the death of general Justo Rufino Barrios on 2 April in Chalchuapa, the Nicaraguan colonel from the Guatemalan Army Rigoberto Cabezas started El Pueblo newspaper, where he tried to do healthy opposition to interim president general Manuel Lisandro Barillas; in this newspaper Spínola started his journalism career. In his first issue, Cabezas point out that opposition is the stand stone for a republican government and that, provided his newspaper reach its tenth issue, Barillas would have demonstrated he was worthy of having the Constitution modified to allow him run as president, even though he was the interim. Cabeza was expelled from Guatemala after only three issues of El Pueblo, and Barillas modified the Constitution and became president for the 1886–1892 term.

Following Cabezas exile, Spínola escaped from Guatemala and went into Mexico, where he had to do several menial jobs to survive; there, he met several important personalities of the time, including write and diplomat Federico Gamboa, who in his memories tells about Spínola difficult ordeal. Spínola had to work in whichever job he could find, including a third category municipal clerk in Orizaba, Veracruz.

Upon return to Guatemala, Spínola studied medicine in the National University, although he finally chose Literature, journalism and -above all- public speaking. In 1893 he was a representative in the National Assembly, a philosophy professor in the National Institute and was one of the main public speakers for the general José María Reina Barrios government. Among his most famous speeches were the one that he gave in the name of the National Assembly during the seventy second anniversary of the Independence of Central America on 15 September 1893, the one about general Miguel García Granados when the remains of the former president were moved to the newly built Guatemala City General Cemetery on 30 June 1894, and the one we pronounced in Nicaragua celebrating the expulsion of William Walker on 15 September 1895.

Spínola married Florencia Strecker Frías, a resident of Mexico, who was a descendant of Lope Ruiz de Esparza, Basque nobleman from Pamplona and patriarch of the prominent Ruiz de Esparza family from Aguascalientes, Zacatecas and Altos de Jalisco.

=== La Ilustración Guatemalteca ===
From 1896 to 1897 Spínola was editor in chief of La Ilustración Guatemalteca, a biweekly cultural magazine that, even though it was only published until 1898, is to this day an important reference for the economic and political situation of Guatemala during the last year of general José María Reina Barrios government. La Ilustración Guatemalteca included extended articles about the Exposición Centroamericana of 1897 –in which Spínola pronounced the inaugural speech– the demarcation of the international border with Mexico in 1897 and the economical crisis that resulted in the September 1897 revolts and the eventual assassination of president Reina Barrios on 8 February 1898.

=== Exposición Centroamericana ===
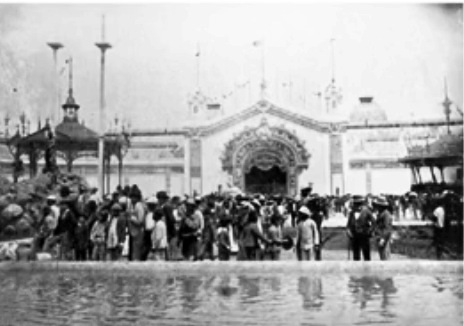
Exposición Centroamericana headquarters in 1897.

Spínola, as director of La Ilustración Guatemalteca and professional speaker, pronounced the inaugural speech of the Exposition on 15 March 1897. His speech gives a complete idea of the large efforts that the Guatemalan government had to make in order to make the Exposition and the hopes that Reina Barrios had in its success. Summarizing it, Spínola welcomed the Central America nations that joined the event, and the other countries that presented their products and services: Germany, Belgium, Chile, Spain, the United States, France, England, Italy, Mexico, Peru and Russia. Then, he described the nature of the exhibitions: industrial and scientific inventions -among which the most important by far was electricity and its applications- and all kinds of artistic work.

Afterwards, Spínola explained that this event was also a socioeconomic one, with the aim to address the main problem Guatemala faced at the time: the lack of civilization of the indigenous population; although he acknowledged that the Exposition by itself was not going to be able to solve such a complex problem, he pointed out that it was going to help to start solving it. Then, he explained that profit with the event was not the purpose of the government, but to present Central America's industry and services to international visitors.

Finally, Spínola told the audience that there was a political goal from the Exposition: to serve as a pacific event to work toward the unification of the Central American republics.

=== Manuel Estrada Cabrera presidency ===
After president Reina Barrios assassination on 8 February 1898, Spínola left La Ilustración for La Idea Liberal where he worked for Estrada Cabrera's presidential campaign. Estrada Cabrera was then interim president, as he was the first designated by law in case of Reina Barrios death. In return for his extensive work in La Idea Liberal once Estrada Cabrera was elected president, he appointed Spínola as second secretary of Infrastructure on 2 October 1898.

In January 1899, Federico Gamboa arrived to Guatemala as Mexico ambassador and immediately set out to look for Spínola; in his memoirs, Gamboa wrote that Spínola kept his youthful presence and dressed casually and preferably with black of very dark clothes. By then it was an inseparable friend of Cuban poet and diplomat José Joaquín Palma, who was in charge of the Cuban consulate in Guatemala and had been a professor in the Instituto Nacional and director of the National Library.

When Estrada Cabrera started his first official term on 15 March 1899, he appointed Spínola as Secretary of Infrastructure, who in that office made to important contributions for the Cabrera regime: he had the idea to celebrate the "Fiestas Minervalias", and educational and propaganda event design to promote Estrada Cabrera's government overseas; and he also wrote and signed the treaty by which an American company got that concession of the Northern Railroad for 99 years, being the first of a series of damaging contract for Guatemala and eventually leading to settlement of the United Fruit Company in that country.

=== First "Fiestas Minervalias" ===
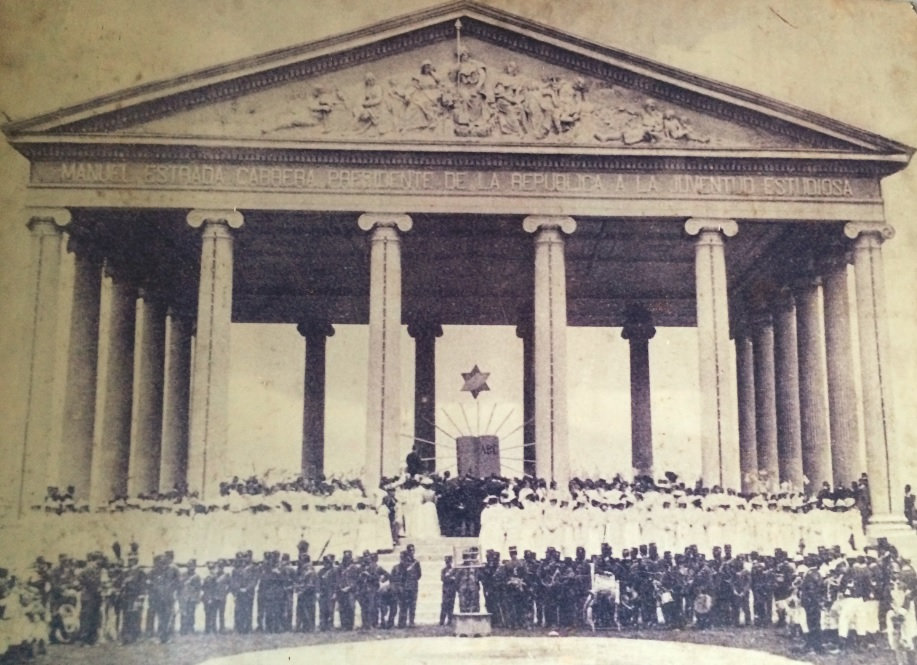
Temple of Minerva de la ciudad de Guatemala en 1905, durante las Fiestas Minervalias de ese year.

And it is us, who have been accused of lack of religious beliefs, only because we broke the superstition bond and love Freedom, we also have our God, but so pure, that we are unable to find any symbol that represents Him accurately, so we adore him in His pure essence, which is Knowledge.

— Rafael Spínola
First "Fiesta de Minerva" inaugural speech
1899

By decree 604 of 29 October 1899, written by Estrada Cabrera himself, the celebration of "Fiestas Minervalias" was established, in order to close the school year; celebrations were to occur on the last Sunday of October, each year. Over the years, these celebrations had children and military parades, military exercises, and award ceremonies in the Temple of Minerva. After the official speeches, and the ceremonies, there was a lunch given by the elite ladies and, after the children celebrations, there were adult dancing and partying at night.

In 1900, Spínola published the first edition of Moral razonada y lecturas escogidas (Reasoned Morals and chosen readings). The book, about morality and manners, had a fantastic reception and a second edition was published in 1928 and a third in 1961. About how that book came to be, Nicaraguan lawyer and write Juan M. Mendoza explained that they had several chats among the staff of the La Idea Liberal newspaper; among the staff were Enrique Gómez Carrillo, Spínola, Ramón A. Salazar, Máximo Soto Hall and other Guatemalan intellectuals, who frequently discussed literary topics. Here is where Spínola had the idea to write his book; furthermore, from their discussions he wrote the book almost in its entirety.

== Death ==
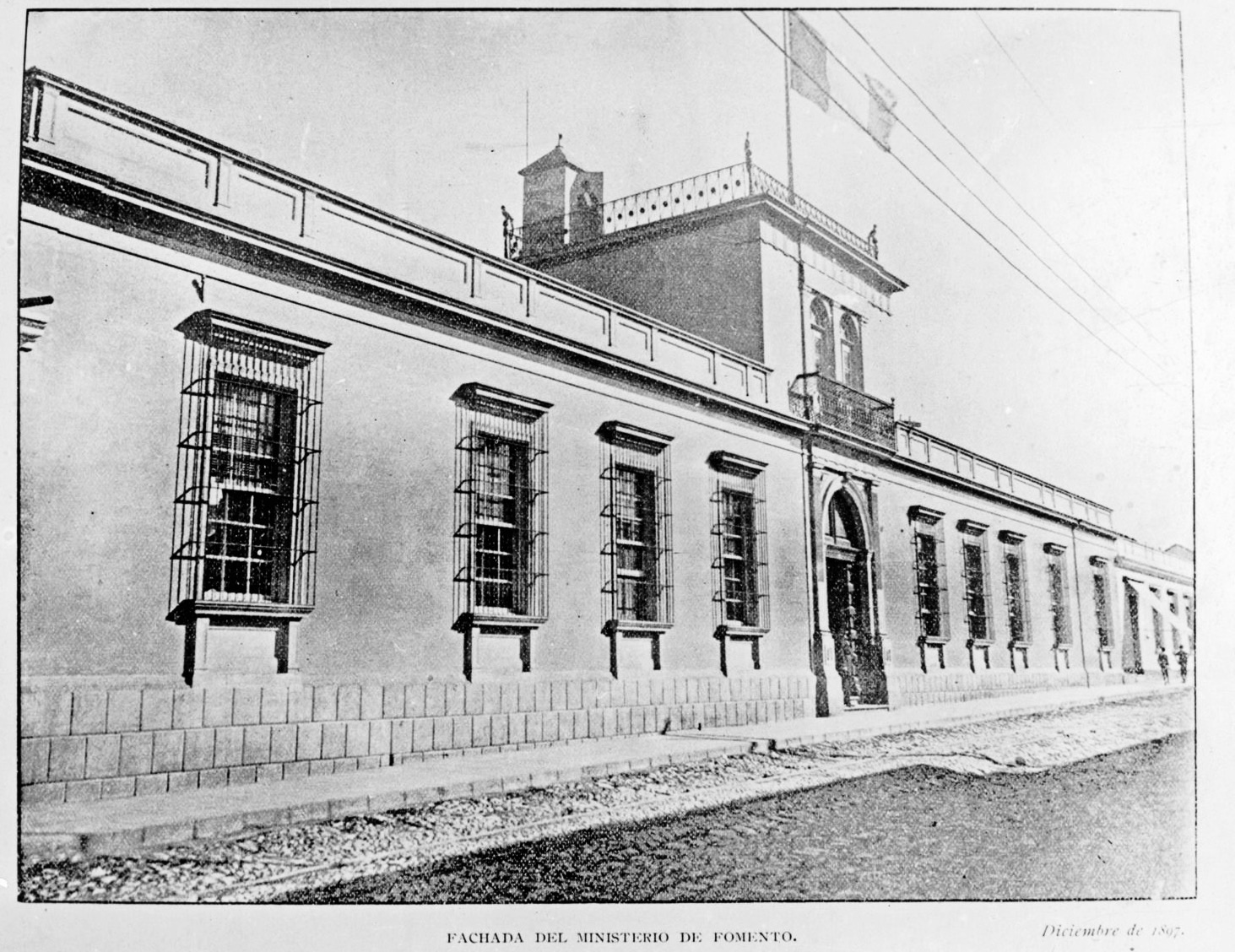
Secretariat of Infrastructure in Guatemala City, where Spinola's office was and where his wake took place in 1901.

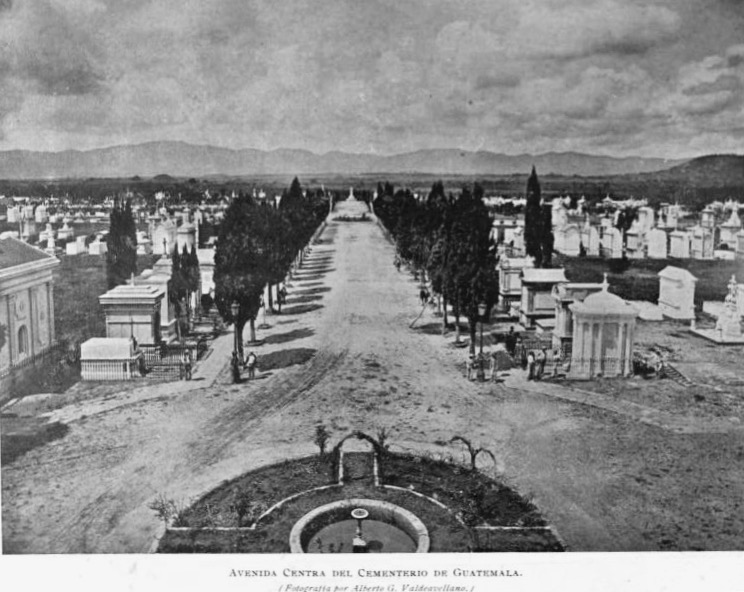
This is how the Guatemala City General Cemetery looked like when Spínola was laid to rest in 1901.

Spínola died when he was 45 years old, on 4 October 1901, and therefore he did not see what the "Fiestas Minervalias" became nor the strong influence and political power that the United Fruit Company had in Guatemala, along with its subsidiary, International Railways of Central America.

Spínola's wake took place in the Ministry that he was in charge of, presided by Manuel Estrada Cabrera; cabinet members, national representatives and diplomats were in attendance . After the ceremony, the funeral left for the Guatemala City General Cemetery where there were more official speeches before he was finally buried.

Since Spínola's wife had died a year earlier, his daughters -Magdalena and Stella, were split up: Stella went to live with her paternal grandparents and Magdalena was sent to live with her maternal grandparents. Magdalena's neighbor was Miguel Ángel Asturias, who became her childhood friend and with whom she discussed their awakening love of literature. Asturias would later dedicate his first book to her.

== See also ==
- Antonio Macías del Real
- Exposición Centroamericana
- International Railways of Central America
- José María Reina Barrios
- La Ilustración Guatemalteca
- Manuel Estrada Cabrera
