= Chinautla =

- Municipality
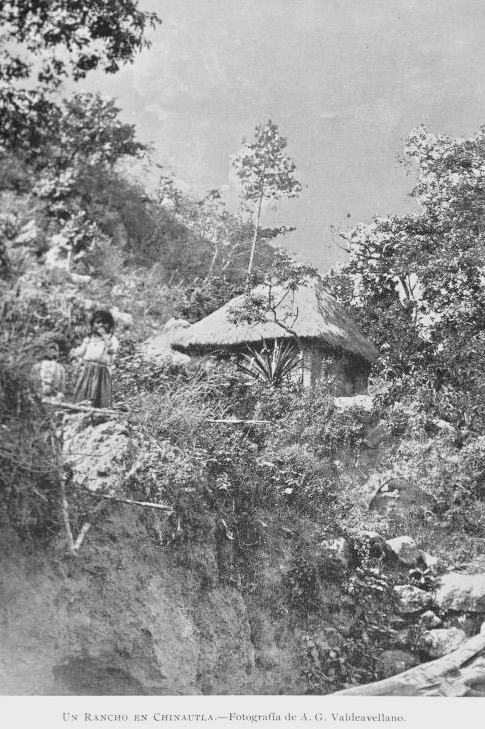
- Native residence in Chinautla in 1897; Photograph by Alberto G. Valdeavellano

- Flag Coat of arms

- Location in Guatemala
- Coordinates: 14°42′0″N 90°30′0″W
- Country: Guatemala
- Department: Guatemala
- Established: 1723

Government
  - Mayor (2016-2020): Brenda del Cid Medrano (LIDER)

Area
  - Municipality: 21.7 sq mi (56.3 km^{2})
- Elevation: 4,042 ft (1,232 m)

Population (2018 census)
  - Municipality: 114,752
  - Density: 5,280/sq mi (2,040/km^{2})
  - Urban: 104,972
- Climate: Aw

Chinautla (Spanish pronunciation: [tʃiˈnawtla]) is a city and municipality in the Guatemala department of Guatemala. The city has a population of 104,972 (2018 census) making it the fourteenth largest city in the country and the seventh largest in the Guatemala Department.

== Administrative division ==
Chinautla has eleven villages:

1. Los Jocotales
2. San Martín
3. San José Buena Vista
4. El Durazno
5. Tres Sabanas
6. Las Lomas
7. Cumbre de Guayabo
8. San Antonio las Flores
9. San Rafael las Flores
10. La Laguneta
11. El Chan
12. Concepción Sacojito

== Climate ==
Chinautla has tropical climate (Köppen: Aw).

Climate data for Chinautla
Month	Jan	Feb	Mar	Apr	May	Jun	Jul	Aug	Sep	Oct	Nov	Dec	Year
Mean daily maximum °C (°F)	25.8 (78.4)	26.8 (80.2)	28.3 (82.9)	28.7 (83.7)	28.4 (83.1)	27.0 (80.6)	26.8 (80.2)	27.1 (80.8)	26.4 (79.5)	26.0 (78.8)	25.8 (78.4)	25.5 (77.9)	26.9 (80.4)
Daily mean °C (°F)	19.6 (67.3)	20.3 (68.5)	21.6 (70.9)	22.5 (72.5)	22.7 (72.9)	22.2 (72.0)	21.9 (71.4)	22.0 (71.6)	21.6 (70.9)	21.1 (70.0)	20.4 (68.7)	19.6 (67.3)	21.3 (70.3)
Mean daily minimum °C (°F)	13.5 (56.3)	13.9 (57.0)	15.0 (59.0)	16.3 (61.3)	17.0 (62.6)	17.4 (63.3)	17.1 (62.8)	16.9 (62.4)	16.8 (62.2)	16.2 (61.2)	15.0 (59.0)	13.7 (56.7)	15.7 (60.3)
Average precipitation mm (inches)	1 (0.0)	2 (0.1)	5 (0.2)	25 (1.0)	103 (4.1)	207 (8.1)	187 (7.4)	132 (5.2)	211 (8.3)	96 (3.8)	16 (0.6)	2 (0.1)	987 (38.9)
Source: Climate-Data.org

== Geographic location ==
Located at the center of Guatemala Department, it is surrounded by municipalities of that department only:

== See also ==
- List of places in Guatemala
- Guatemala City

== Notes and references ==
=== Bibliography ===
- Valdeavellano, Alberto G. (1897). "Indígenas de Chinautla". La Ilustración Guatemalteca (in Spanish). I (15). Guatemala.
