= Exposición Centroamericana =

1897 industrial and cultural exposition in Guatemala

Central American Expo
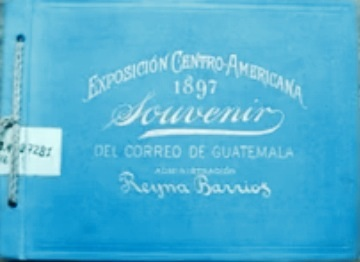
- Exposición Centroamericana proceedings

Overview
- BIE-class: Unrecognized exposition
- Name: Central American Expo
- Visitors: 40,000
- Organized by: Guatemalan government

Location
- Country: Guatemala
- City: Guatemala City
- Venue: Central American Expo, "30 de Junio" Boulevard

Timeline
- Opening: 1897
- Closure: 1 September 1897

The Exposición Centroamericana (Central American Expo) was an industrial and cultural exposition that took place in Guatemala in 1897 and which was approved on 8 March 1894 by the National Assembly by Decree 253 by a suggestion made by president general José María Reina Barrios, at a time when both coffee – only Guatemalan export at the time- and silver international prices were at an all-time high. Its main goal was to showcase the Interoceanic railroad between Iztapa on the Pacific coast and Puerto Barrios on the Atlantic, a project that was well ahead by January 1897, but that was left unfinished when Guatemala went into a deep crisis due to both coffee and silver international prices plummeting after the government had built numerous public buildings and palaces in Guatemala City, simultaneously with the railroad projects. As a result, the Expo failed dramatically, the Guatemalan economic crisis gave rise to several rebellions -mainly the ones in the Highlands and the one on the Eastern Side and president Reina Barrios was eventually assassinated on 8 February 1898.

== Motivation ==
The Expo was inspired on the Fourth Universal Expo in Paris, which took place in 1889. (Note: The first Paris Expo took place in 1798, to promote and showcase France commercial and industrial products.)

According to the official decree, the government explained that "thanks to the beneficial peace that the country had reached, it is time for Guatemala to showcase its advances in agriculture and those works children of the intelligence and ingenuity of our fellow countrymen in an Expo that will be a Peace Feast where Guatemala will render its best accomplishments".

According to plan, the Exposición Centroamericana would be open to the public on 15 March 1897 and it would take place along "30 June" Boulevard which was under construction outside Guatemala City at the time. The Expo was to be installed in seventeen main buildings of different sizes, from a main hall for Central American and California pavilions to small buildings for restaurant and administrative offices.

== Goals ==
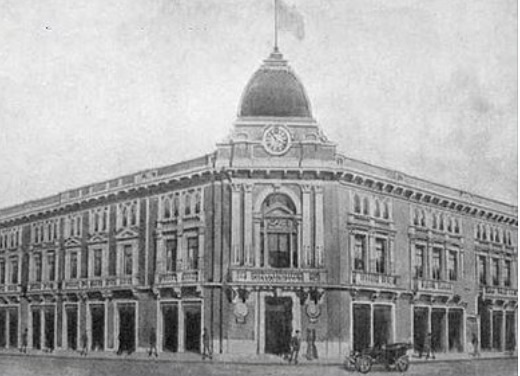
Hotel Exposición, opened in 1896.

The Expo goals, according to the Guatemalan government were: "gather diverse goods to by them; learn about what one does not know anything about; improve what it is already known; share with others what is made in Guatemala; awake and stimulate human labor; tighten universal fraternity; and showcase Guatemala with dignity, by means of a grand celebration of civilization and culture."

Given that in those days most visitors arriving from Europe and North America arrived at the port on the Caribbean Sea shore, Reina Barrios pushed for the Northern Railroad to be finished on time. Not only was the railroad vital for the Expo success, it was key to transport merchandise and passengers between the Caribbean Sea and the new Port of Iztapa on the Pacific shore of the country. Reina Barrios had high hopes on the railroad to improve the progress and development of the country given that the United States and Spain were still at war over Cuba, and it was evident that a dependable interoceanic communication line was crucial for the North American country.

== Guatemala economic situation in 1897 ==
Interoceanic railways sections and stations built during general José María Reina Barrios tenure. The Panajax -Guatemala City section could not be built due to the steep mountain terrain and the lack of funds after the Guatemalan economy crashed in early 1897.
1. Puerto Barrios
2. Tenedores
3. Los Amates
4. Gualán
5. El Rancho
6. Panajax
7. Palín
8. Escuintla
9. Iztapa

In March 1897, about the same time the Expo was opened to the public the cultural magazine La Ilustración Guatemalteca published a detailed analysis of the economy. At that time, the banks perceived the bad situation and had attempted to improve their balance sheets by requesting collaterals, closing bad credits and printing pamphlets that, instead of help, induced financial panic among the citizens. Furthermore, some of the banks had increased considerably the interest rates, taking advantage of the concession the government gave them to print paper money.

At that point, the public bonds had not only ceased to increase in value, but actually started to plummet rapidly; for example, between June 1896 and February 1897, the Expo bonds and the Northern Railroad bonds dropped from $90 to $44 and from $80 to $32, respectively. The floating debt bonds, originally issued for three million Guatemalan pesos, were not available except for $380,000 that belonged to a very reduced group of wealthy people, who did not offered them because they did not have the need at the moment. Finally, the Northern Railroad bonds were the ones that dropped the most in value, given that they had been purchased by employees and middle-class people, who had been forced to sell them to survive.

Following its analysis, La Ilustración Guatemalteca, reported that in March 1897 there was an almost absolute commercial paralysis due to lack of cash, a critical problem that was beginning to impact commercial, agricultural and industrial activities. The root cause for this serious problem was the excessive support that the Reina Barrios administration had given to fictitious needs -i.e., embellishing Guatemala City, a water project in Acatán and the millionaire expenses that went to the Central American Expo- which were done without considering the real country's balance sheet and that required massive private investors to help buying government bonds. This government attitude had spread into the general population, and the families were living in an era of luxury and vanity extending well beyond their means; all this results in a general abuse of credit and speculation. At that point, it was considered that the only solution was tight austerity measures, and there was a generalized fear that the country could go bankrupt.

Finally, the lack of product diversity and the overdependence on coffee was a major drawback when it came to supply for the country needs when the coffee international price plummeted; on the other hand, everything was imported and consequently the country owed not only the merchandise but also the current exchange, fleets and commissions. Guatemalan exports did not even reach twenty millions pesos and, given that too many plantations where owner by German and other legal aliens, only a fraction of the total exports value got the public treasury.

In summary: there was not any balance in the Guatemalan commerce in 1897 and tight austerity measures were urged provided they were coupled with a long term loan that had to be negotiated for good terms for the country and not like all the borrowing done in Guatemala up to that point in which the interest rates were excessive and the money was not managed honestly.

== Pavilions ==
=== Costa Rica pavilion ===
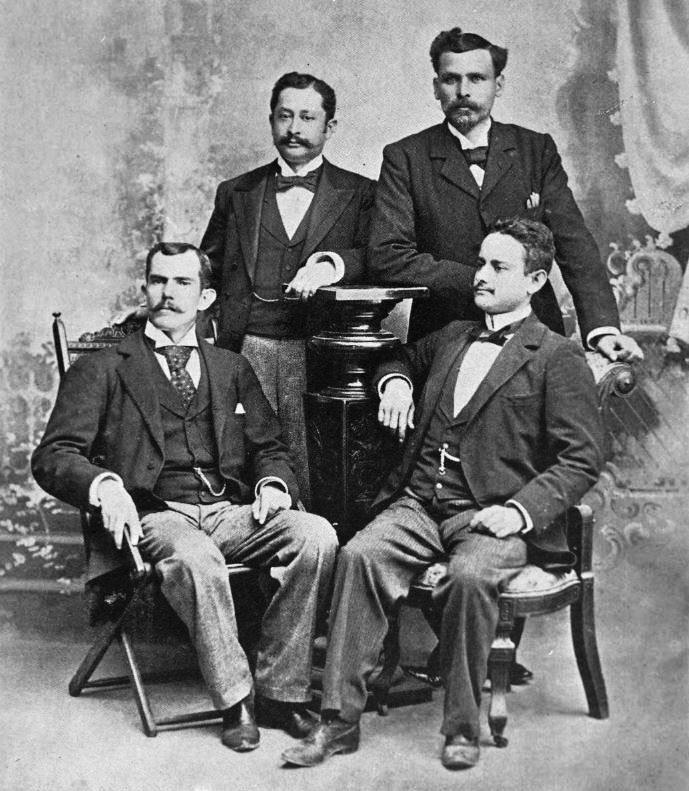
Costa Rica delegation in the 1897 Central American Expo1. From left to right: Carlos Bolio Tinoco, Luis Loria, Genero Castro and Anastasio Alfaro.

Costa Rica sent four delegation members: Luis Loria was in charge of the Costa Rican educative system; by then, Costa Rica already had a system that for two hundred and fifty thousand inhabitants had three hundred and sixty six public schools, which served ten thousand and three hundred children turning it in the most illustrated country in Latin America at the time.

Anastasio Alfaro, San José National Museum director at the time, was in charge of the Zoology display. Alfaro had already been in charge of Costa Rica's pavilions in Madrid (Historical American Exposition) and Chicago Expos. Carlos Bolio Tinoco was the president of the delegation, and was the San José governor at the time.

=== Royal British Navy Imperieuse cruise visit ===
The United Kingdom sent admiral Leger Bury Palliser to give his respect in the name of the crown to the Guatemalan government. The British colony in Guatemala gave a grand ball in their honor in the "Club Guatemalteco". In charge of the celebrations were Stanley MacNider, in charge of the telegraph installations in Guatemala, consul J. Frederick Roberts -who had distinguished service with the Royal Army in Africa- and second consul Carlos Fleischmann.

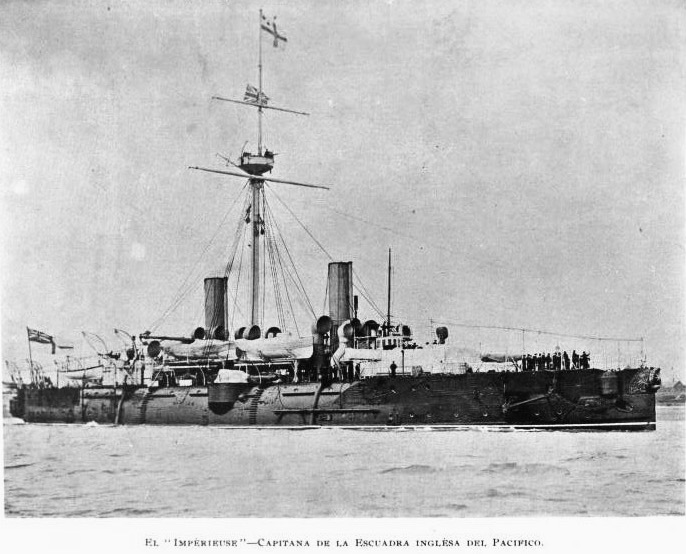
Royal British Navy Imperieuse cruise. Visited Guatemala in 1897 as goodwill Ambassador from the United Kingdom.

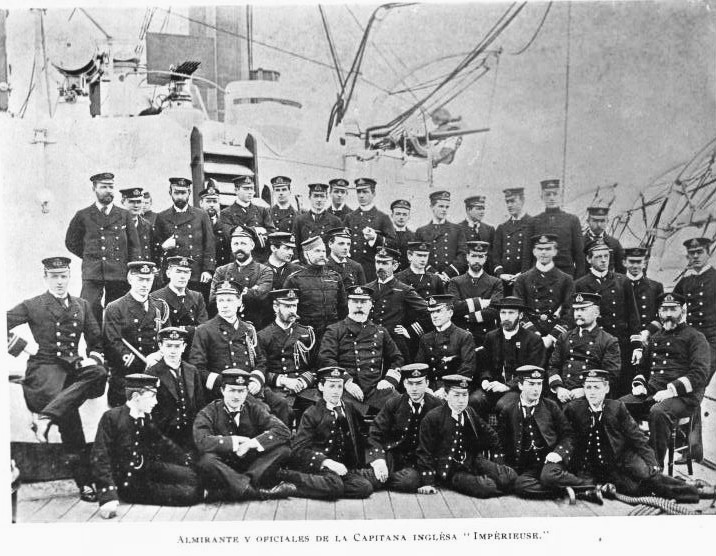
Imperieuse crew during their visit to Guatemala.

=== Germany stand ===
(Germany) shared its pavilion with Switzerland's in the "Krupp" building, which had been brought from Chicago and was put together by Oscar von Polstchick. Among the products and industries the Germans showcased were: dynamite and explosive accessories by Sprengstoff Gesellschaft Kosmos, thru E. Ascoli y Co., their Guatemalan dealer; aniline colors and chemical products, cologne by Johann Marie Farina -who a Grand Prize award-, and beer. They also had a variety of paper and cardboard for bookstores and printers, watches, and others.

=== Belgium pavilion ===
The Belgian stand was dominated by weaponry exhibitions from "la Cartoucherie Belge", an ammunition factory. However, they also presented a zinc factory, a glass mill, a lingerie factory from Brussels and a company that produced bronze medals, trophies, sculptures and lamps; and finally, the showcased other fabric products, mainly wool.

=== Other pavilions ===
On 15 May the newspapers reported that Honduras, El Salvador and Nicaragua stands had not been opened yet because the cargo shipped to Guatemala was not delivered on time due to a scheduling conflict. Furthermore, the newspapers indicated that Argentina did not participate in the Expo because the diplomatic proceedings were not performed correctly.

Dr. Ramón Salazar, La Ilustración Guatemalteca editor and journalist, presented a Literature stand where he showcased several historic pieces: the first newspaper ever printed in Guatemala in 1729, La Gazeta de Goathemala; Diario de Guatemala, the first daily newspaper in Central America; and La Sociedad Económica, the first commercial news bulletin. He also present a collection of several Guatemalan publishers and even writings from the old Franciscan convent, which then belonged to the Guatemalan National Library.

=== Closing ceremony ===
The Northern Railroad was not finished on time for the Expo with only 90 miles to reach Guatemala City -but these were the most difficult miles to build given the high mountains on the way between El Rancho and Guatemala City. The unfinished railroad and the economical crisis meant that few nationals and even fewer visitors attended the Expo, which only had about 40,000 visitors in four months. On 1 September 1897, when it was undeniable that the Expo was a complete failure and the economic crisis was relentless, La Ilustración del Pacífico wrote briefly in its "Resumen Quincenal" (Biweekly briefing) that the Expo had closed its doors.

Therefore, what should have been a major accomplishment for Guatemala, resulted instead in a complete failure that did not meet any of its goals: did not help the immigration to Guatemala and did not get any foreign investor interested in the national industry. Besides not accomplishing a Central American Union, it also pushed the country to the verge of economic collapse given the fall of coffee and silver international prices.

== Consequences ==
=== For the country ===
The Expo failure was a devastating blow to the Guatemalan economy:

1. Lack of any international investor -which was the last hope Reina Barrios had to recover the national economy- left Guatemala without sufficient funds to pay the large debt it had due to infrastructures projects.
2. When Reina Barrios tried to extend his presidential term, there were revolutions both in Quetzaltenango and Chiquimula. Although these were put down, the country remained in turmoil until British citizen Edgar Zollinger murdered the president on 8 February 1898.
3. The large debt with British banks president Manuel Estrada Cabrera inherited from Reina Barrios, forced him to seek both economic and military help from the United States in order to avoid a potential British invasion intended to get the debt paid.
4. The Northern Railroad was not finished until 1908, thanks in part to the concession of the line to United Fruit Company (UFCO), but by then the interoceanic railway was not the critical way it had been; by then, the United States had defeated Spain and after several discussions with Nicaragua and Colombia, had chosen Colombia to build and interoceanic canal and causing the separation of Panama from Colombia when the latter had tried to increase the concession conditions to build the canal. The American policy towards Central America in 1908 was focused on keeping the region as peaceful as possible, using for it American companies investments -e.g., United Fruit Company- and military interventions like the one in Panamá in 1903 and the ousting of Nicaraguan president José Santos Zelaya in 1911; all aimed to keep a swift and smooth construction of the Panama Canal.

=== For those who participated in it ===
Those individuals who participated in the Expo project were also impacted; Mexican interim ambassador Federico Gamboa tells in his memoirs that Spanish sculptor Justo de Gandarias, and elderly man when he met him on 20 June 1899, was still in Guatemala two years after the failed Expo because the government had not paid him for his services. Two years after that, Gamboa met with the sculptor again, and this time he tells that Gandarias had lost all hope of ever getting paid and that was in Guatemala barely surviving by selling cigarettes in Guatemala City; Gamboa visited Gandarias at his home and tells how the sculptures place was in total disarray, but kept some old paintings and sculptures that he was hoping to sell if he ever went back to Spain.

== See also ==
- Northern Railroad of Guatemala
- José María Reina Barrios
- La Ilustración Guatemalteca
- Rafael Spinola
- Ricardo Casanova y Estrada

== Notes and references ==
=== Bibliography ===
- Asociación filatélica de Guatemala. "Muestra filatélica de la Exposición Centroamericana 1897". Facebook (in Spanish).
- Buchenau, J. (1996). Under the Shadow of the Giant, the making of Mexico's policy to Central America (1876–1930). Alabama: University of Alabama.
- Castellanos, María Lorena (2014). "Vida y obra de José María Reina Barrios". Universidad Francisco Marroquín (in Spanish). Guatemala.
- Castellanos, María Lorena (2015). "Exposición Centroamericana de 1897". Academia.edu (in Spanish). Guatemala.
- El Guatemalteco (1896). "Boletín de la Exposición Centroamericana". El Guatemalteco, diario oficial de la República de Guatemala en la América Central (in Spanish) (1). Guatemala.
- Gamboa, Federico (1910). Gómez de la Puente, Eusebio (ed.). Mi diario, primera serie (PDF) (in Spanish). México: La Europea. Archived from the original (PDF) on 4 June 2015.
- — (1920). Gómez de la Puente, Eusebio (ed.). Mi diario, primera serie (in Spanish). Vol. III. México: Hispano Americana.
- Gobierno de Guatemala (1 August 1896). "Boletín de la Exposición Centro-Americana, 1 de agosto 1896". Boletín de la Exposición Centro-americana (in Spanish). Guatemala.
- Gobierno de Guatemala (1897). "Boletín de la Exposición Centro-Americana, 1897". Boletín de la Exposición Centro-americana (in Spanish) (23). Guatemala.
- Guatemala del Ayer. "Imágenes del edificio de la Gran Exposición Centroamericana". Guatemala de ayer (in Spanish).
- La Ilustración del Pacífico (1 August 1897). "Editorial: Confirmado". La Ilustración del Pacífico (in Spanish). II (25). Guatemala: Síguere, Guirola y Cía.
- La Ilustración Guatemalteca (1896). "Nuestras fronteras". La Ilustración Guatemalteca (in Spanish). I. Guatemala: Síguere, Guirola y Cía.
- — (15 April 1897a). "Nuestros grabados". La Ilustración Guatemalteca (in Spanish). I (18). Guatemala: Síguere, Guirola y Cía.
- — (15 May 1897b). "Resumen quincenal". La Ilustración Guatemalteca (in Spanish). I (20). Guatemala: Síguere, Guirola y Cía.
- — (1 June 1897c). "Chile en la Exposición". La Ilustración Guatemalteca (in Spanish). I (21). Guatemala: Síguere, Guirola y Cía.
- La República (10 March 1897). "La Exposición". La Ilustración Guatemalteca (in Spanish). I (16). Guatemala: Síguere, Guirola y Cía.
- — (16 March 1897). "La Exposición". La República (in Spanish). Guatemala.
- Macías del Real, A. (1 December 1896). "Dr. Gustavo E. Guzmán". La Ilustración Guatemalteca (in Spanish). I (9). Guatemala: Síguere, Guirola y Cía.
- — (1 June 1897c). "La Exposición". La Ilustración Guatemalteca (in Spanish). I (21). Guatemala: Síguere, Guirola y Cía.
- — (1 August 1897d). "Resumen quincenal". La Ilustración del Pacífico (in Spanish). II (25). Guatemala: Síguere, Guirola y Cía.
- — (1 September 1897e). "La Ilustración Guatemalteca". La Ilustración del Pacífico (in Spanish). II (27). Guatemala: Síguere, Guirola y Cía.
- Saravia, José Miguel (1897). "Situación económica". La Ilustración Guatemalteca (in Spanish). I (16). Guatemala: Síguere, Guirola y Cía.
- Spinola, Rafael (15 March 1897a). "Discurso de inauguración". La Ilustración Guatemalteca (in Spanish). I (16). Guatemala: Síguere, Guirola y Cía.
- — (15 June 1897b). "Costa Rica en la Exposición". La Ilustración Guatemalteca (in Spanish). I (22). Guatemala: Síguere, Guirola y Cía.
