= Temple of Minerva (Guatemala) =

Coordinates: 14.6228°N 90.5314°W

The Temple of Minerva was a Greek style temple erected in Guatemala City by the government of president Manuel Estrada Cabrera in 1901 to celebrate the Fiestas Minervalias. Soon, the main cities in the rest of Guatemala built similar structures as well.

== Temples built in the Republic ==
Several Temples of Minerva were built across Guatemala, and a few of them still stand:

Departament	Image	Number of temples	Opening date	Condition in the 21st century
Baja Verapaz		1	1916	Still standing
Chimaltenango		1	20 April 1909	Demolished
Chiquimula	Chiquimula Quezaltepeque	3	27 October 1907	Still standing
Escuintla		2	Plaza de los Cocales (1906) y Escuintla (1916)	Demolished
Huehuetenango		4	1904	Still standing
Jalapa		1	1909	Still standing
Quetzaltenango		3	N/A	Still standing
Sacatepéquez		1	N/A	Demolished

== See also ==
- Manuel Estrada Cabrera

== Notes and references ==
=== Bibliography ===
- Arévalo Martínez, Rafael (1945). ¡Ecce Pericles! (in Spanish). Guatemala: Tipografía Nacional.
- Carrera Mejía, Mynor (n.d.). Las Fiestas de Minerva en Guatemala, 1899-1919: El ansia de progreso y de civilización de los liberales (in Spanish). Costa Rica: Universidad de Costa Rica. Archived from the original on 2015-06-01.
- Diario de Centro América (30 October 1899). "Fiestas de Minerva". Diario de Centro América (in Spanish). Guatemala.
- Gobierno de Guatemala (1907). Álbum de Minerva 1907 (in Spanish). Vol. VII. Guatemala: Tipografía Nacional.
- Luján Muñoz, Jorge (1992). "Un ejemplo de uso de la tradición clásica en Guatemala: Las "Minervalias" establecidas por el presidente Manuel Estrada Cabrera" (PDF). Revista de la Universidad del Valle de Guatemala (in Spanish) (2). Guatemala. Archived from the original (PDF) on 2016-03-04.
- Macías del Real, A. (1897). "El Arzobispo Ricardo Casanova y Estrada". La Ilustración Guatemalteca (in Spanish). I (17). Guatemala: Síguere, Guirola y Cía.
- Mendoza, Juan M. (1940). Enrique Gómez Carrillo. Estudio crítico-biográfico. Su vida, su obra y su época (in Spanish). Vol. Tomo II. Guatemala: Unión Tipográfica, Muñoz Plaza y Cía.
- Valladares, Manuel (3 April 1928). "El tinterillo en el poder". Nuestro Diario (in Spanish). Guatemala.
