= Pajapita =

- Municipality
- Location in Guatemala
- Coordinates: 14°43′00″N 92°02′00″W
- Country: Guatemala
- Department: San Marcos

Government
  - Mayor (2016-2020): Walter López (UCN)

Population (2018 census)
  - Municipality: 21,725
  - Urban: 6,817
- Climate: Am

Pajapita is a town and municipality in the San Marcos department of Guatemala.It was created on 31 May 1920, after the station of Vado Ancho on the Panamerican Railroad of Guatemala was built. Due to its privileged location on the way from Guatemala to Mexico, Pajapita enjoyed considerable development while the Guatemalan railways were owned by International Railways of Central America (IRCA), an American company that belonged to the United Fruit Company. However, with the decline of the rail that followed the constructions of major highways in the country the importance of the town of Vado Ancho diminished, to the point that in the early 21st century it was completely abandoned.

Pajapita is called also "Land of the Almond trees".

== Transport ==
=== Panamerican Railroad of Guatemala ===
Stations and stretches of the Panamerican Railroad that had been given in concession to Antonio Macías del Real in 1902.
1. Vado Ancho, Pajapita, San Marcos
2. Coatepeque, Quetzaltenango
3. Caballo Blanco, Retalhuleu
4. Las Cruces, Retalhuleu

Pajapita started developing with the construction of the Vado Ancho railroad terminal in the 1900s. On April 18, 1902, thanks to his excellent personal rapport with then president Manuel Estrada Cabrera, pharmacist and writer Antonio Macías del Real won the concession to build the Panamerican Railroad of Guatemala sections between Las Cruces, Retalhuleu and Vado Ancho in Pajapita; however, he could not finish the line to Coatepeque in Quetzaltenango Department and had to give away his rights to the Central Railway Company, who finished the section. The original contract with Macías del Real had been extremely generous and had been signed by the lieutenant secretary of Economy, José Flamenco and approved by Estrada Cabrera; the contract authorized the exclusivity on the construction and usage of the railroad for twenty four years, counting from the moment the section was open to the public. Besides, Macías del Real and his descendants would have enjoyed the revenue from the railway for 99 years, after which the line was supposed to go back to the State of Guatemala.

== Climate ==
Pajapita has tropical climate (Köppen: Am).

Climate data for Pajapita
Month	Jan	Feb	Mar	Apr	May	Jun	Jul	Aug	Sep	Oct	Nov	Dec	Year
Mean daily maximum °C (°F)	33.7 (92.7)	34.1 (93.4)	35.0 (95.0)	34.7 (94.5)	34.2 (93.6)	32.7 (90.9)	33.2 (91.8)	33.4 (92.1)	32.8 (91.0)	32.6 (90.7)	32.8 (91.0)	33.0 (91.4)	33.5 (92.3)
Daily mean °C (°F)	26.4 (79.5)	26.8 (80.2)	27.9 (82.2)	28.3 (82.9)	28.4 (83.1)	27.4 (81.3)	27.6 (81.7)	27.7 (81.9)	27.4 (81.3)	27.2 (81.0)	26.9 (80.4)	26.4 (79.5)	27.4 (81.2)
Mean daily minimum °C (°F)	19.2 (66.6)	19.5 (67.1)	20.9 (69.6)	22.0 (71.6)	22.7 (72.9)	22.2 (72.0)	22.1 (71.8)	22.1 (71.8)	22.1 (71.8)	21.8 (71.2)	21.0 (69.8)	19.8 (67.6)	21.3 (70.3)
Average precipitation mm (inches)	6 (0.2)	7 (0.3)	23 (0.9)	96 (3.8)	245 (9.6)	420 (16.5)	316 (12.4)	329 (13.0)	429 (16.9)	373 (14.7)	80 (3.1)	16 (0.6)	2,340 (92)
Source: Climate-Data.org

== Geographic location ==
Pajapita is surrounded by San Marcos Department municipalities, except by the southeast, where it borders Coatepeque, a Quetzaltenango Department municipality.

== See also ==
- United Fruit Company

== Notes and references ==
=== Bibliography ===
- Chavarría Smeaton, Francisco Antonio (1970). Problemática urbanística de los ferrocarriles en la Ciudad de Guatemala y análisis para su solución en el área metropolitana (PDF) (in Spanish). Guatemala: Facultad de Arquitectura de la Universidad de San Carlos de Guatemala.
- Estrada Paniagua, Felipe (1908). Recopilación de Leyes de Guatemala, 1902-1903 (in Spanish). Vol. XXI. Guatemala: Arturo Síguere y Cía.
