= Juan José de Jesús Yas =

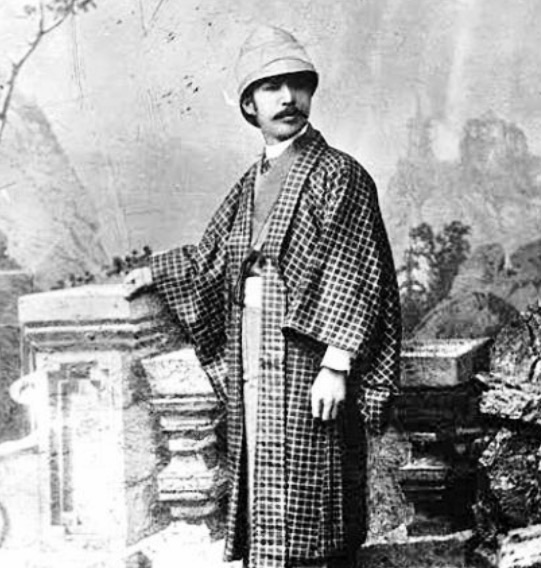
- Yas in the 1890s.
- Born: 1846; Fujisawa, Iwate, Japan
- Died: 1917 (aged 70–71); Antigua Guatemala, Guatemala
- Occupations: Photographer and translator

Juan José de Jesús Yas (born Kohei Yasu; December 27, 1846 - February 28, 1917), was a Japanese-born photographer who established himself in Antigua Guatemala, Guatemala and documented the city toward the end of the 19th century and early 20th century.

== Biography ==
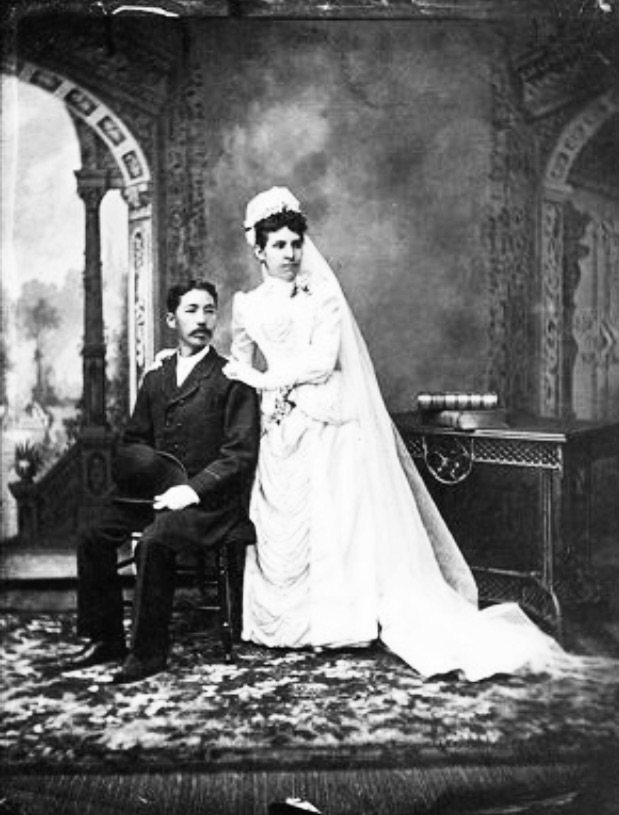
Yas and his wife on their wedding day.

Yas arrived to Guatemala as a translator of the famous Mexican astronomer Covarrubias and he liked photography so much, that he became a student of German professor Herbruger.

== Death ==
He died in Antigua Guatemala in 1917.

== See also ==
- Alberto G. Valdeavellano
- Antigua Guatemala

== Notes and references ==
=== References ===
- Escobar, José Luis (18 June 2017). "El legado fotográfico de Juan José de Jesús Yas". Prensa Libre (in Spanish).
