= Antonio Macías del Real =

Spanish writer and pharmacist (1866–1839)

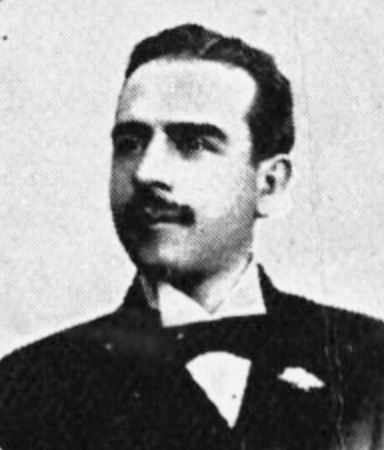
- Macías del Real in 1897
- Born: 1866; Madrid, Spain
- Died: 1939 (aged 72–73); Buenos Aires, Argentina
- Occupations: writer, pharmacist

Antonio Macías del Real (1866–1939) was a Spanish writer and pharmacist who moved to Guatemala where he wrote for most prestigious cultural publications. Among his articles are those that we wrote for La Ilustración Guatemalteca during the last year of general José María Reina Barrios presidency. When the president was assassinated on 8 February 1898, Macías del Real wrote Perfiles biográficos de don Manuel Estrada Cabrera (Biographical profiles of Mr. Manuel Estrada Cabrera, who had been appointed as interim President; Macias del Real kept writing on behalf of the new president since then. In 1902 his adulation paid off, as Estrada Cabrera granted him the Pacific Railroad concession. According to Guatemalan historian Rafael Arévalo Martínez in his book ¡Ecce Pericles!, Macías del Real -a pharmacist graduated from Universidad Central de Madrid and later incorporated in Guatemala- was the one that gave Estrada Cabrera a potent venom that the latter used to get rid of his opponents.

== Biography ==
Stations and stretches of the Panamerican Railroad that had been given in concession to Macías del Real in 1902.
1. Vado Ancho, Pajapita, San Marcos
2. Coatepeque, Quetzaltenango
3. Caballo Blanco, Retalhuleu
4. Las Cruces, Retalhuleu

Macías del Real got his doctorate in pharmacy in Universidad Central de Madrid in 1890, with a dissertation about the pharmaceutical studies of Eucaliptus globulus and he was incorporated into the College of Medicine and Pharmacy of Universidad Nacional in Guatemala on 3 July 1896.

Between 1896 and 1897 he wrote regularly for the La Ilustración Guatemalteca where he worked alongside writer and public speaker Rafael Spinola and with the Guatemalan photography pioneer Alberto G. Valdeavellano. His articles were mainly about political and cultural issues.

On 18 April 1902, given his then excellent relationship with president Manuel Estrada Cabrera, he was granted the concession to build and operate the Panamerican Railroad between Las Cruces and Vado-Ancho; however, he could not build the railway until Coatepeque and had to sell his rights to the Central Railroad Company. The original contract with Macías del Real had been extremely generous and had been signed by the lieutenant secretary of Economy, José Flamenco and approved by Estrada Cabrera; the contract authorized the exclusivity on the construction and usage of the railroad for twenty four years, counting from the moment the section was open to the public. Besides, Macías del Real and his descendants would have enjoyed the revenue from the railway for 99 years, after which the line was supposed to go back to the State of Guatemala.

== See also ==
- Manuel Estrada Cabrera
- La Ilustración Guatemalteca
- Rafael Spinola

== Notes and references ==
=== Bibliography ===
- Arévalo Martínez, Rafael (1945). ¡Ecce Pericles! (in Spanish). Guatemala: Tipografía Nacional.
- Asturias, Francisco (1902). Historia de la medicina en Guatemala (in Spanish). Guatemala: Tipografía Nacional.
- Chavarría Smeaton, Francisco Antonio (1970). Problemática urbanística de los ferrocarriles en la Ciudad de Guatemala y análises para su solución en el área metropolitana (PDF) (in Spanish). Guatemala: Facultad de Arquitectura de la Universidad de San Carlos de Guatemala.
- Estrada Paniagua, Felipe (1908). Recopilación de Leyes de Guatemala, 1902-1903 (in Spanish). Vol. XXI. Guatemala: Arturo Síguere y Cía.
- Macías del Real, A. (1896). "Revista quincenal". La Ilustración Guatemalteca (in Spanish). I (2). Guatemala.
- — (15 February 1897a). "Revista quincenal". La Ilustración Guatemalteca (in Spanish). I (14). Guatemala.
- — (1897b). "El Arzobispo Ricardo Casanova y Estrada". La Ilustración Guatemalteca (in Spanish). I (17). Guatemala: Síguere, Guirola y Cía.
- — (1 August 1897c). "Resumen Quincenal". La Ilustración del Pacífico (in Spanish). II (25). Guatemala: Siguere, Guirola y Cía.
- — (1 August 1897d). "Resumen Quincenal". La Ilustración del Pacífico (in Spanish). II (27). Guatemala: Siguere, Guirola y Cía.
- — (1898). Perfiles biográficos de don Manuel Estrada Cabrera, presidente de la República de Guatemala (in Spanish). Guatemala: El Demócrata.
- Ministerio de Educación, Cultura y Deporte de España (28 May 2015). "Archivo de Antonio Macías del Real". Portal de Archivos Españoles (in Spanish). España. Archived from the original on 28 May 2015.
