= La Ilustración Guatemalteca =

1896–1898 Guatemalan biweekly cultural magazine

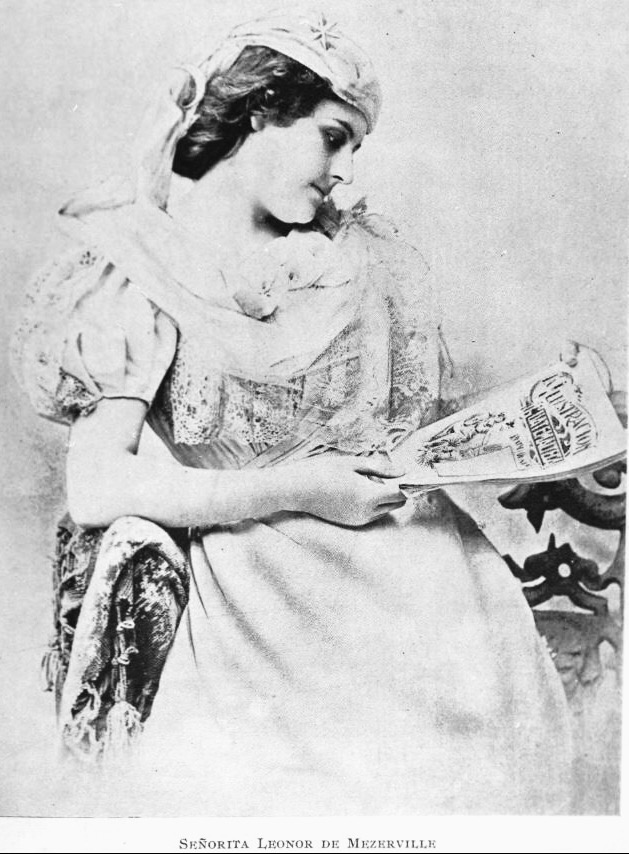
- Miss Leonor de Mezerville with a copy of La Ilustración Guatemalteca; Photograph by Alberto G. Valdeavellano
- Type: Biweekly magazine
- Format: magazine
- Owner: Arturo Síguere y Cía
- Founders: Arturo Siguere; Rafael Spinola; Antonio Macías del Real; Ramón A. Salazar
- Publisher: Arturo Síguere
- Editor: Rafael Spinola
- Opinion editor: Ramón A. Salazar
- Photo editor: Alberto G. Valdeavellano
- Founded: 1 July 1896
- Ceased publication: 15 June 1898
- Political alignment: Liberal
- Language: Spanish
- Headquarters: Ciudad de Guatemala, Guatemala
- Website: La Ilustración Guatemalteca

La Ilustración Guatemalteca (Guatemalan Illustration) was a biweekly cultural magazine that was published in Guatemala from 1 July 1896 to 15 June 1898. At a time when only 5% of the Guatemalan population could read, this magazine had extended articles aimed for the society elite and described numerous episodes of the later years of the presidency of general José María Reina Barrios, especially the economic crisis that originated when coffee – principal export from Guatemala at the time – and silver international prices plummeted. It also described the Exposición Centroamericana (Central American Exposition), an event that Reina Barrios organized to showcase the Interoceanic Railroad in Guatemala – at a time when the Panama Canal had not yet being built – and get Guatemala out of the crisis by means of international investors interested in move their products from the Atlantic to the Pacific Ocean. The magazine presented a good amount of pictures made by Alberto G. Valdeavellano, a photography pioneer from Guatemala.

== History ==
=== 1896-97: La Ilustración Guatemalteca ===
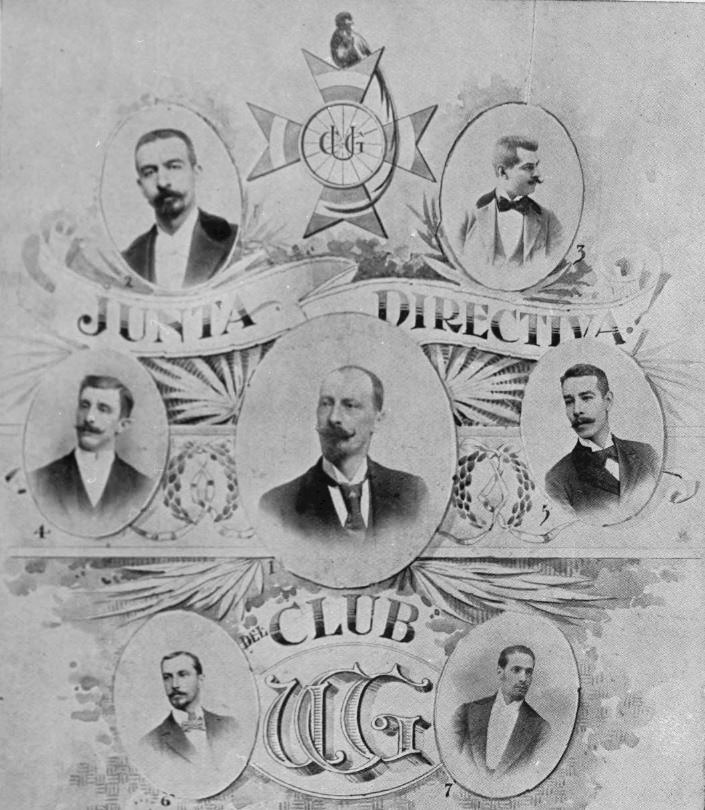
Guatemala Cycling Club board of directors, shown in La Ilustración Guatemalteca on 15 October 1896. The publication was a pioneer on sports coverage in Guatemala.

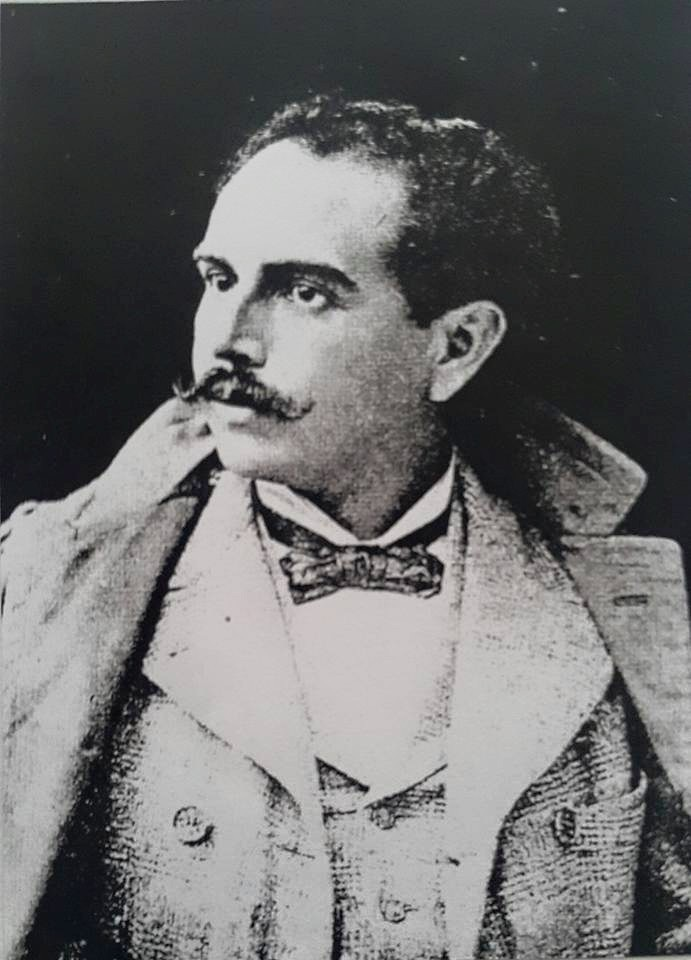
Alberto G. Valdeavellano, photographer.

La Ilustración Guatemalteca appeared on 1 August 1896 aimed to entertain those who could read and were not involved in politics or religious issues. One of its main goals was to promote and inform about the Exposición Centroamericana, an event that then president Reina Barrios had organized at very large cost from the national treasure in order to show the technological advances made in Central America – mainly the Interoceanic Railroad – to potential investors from abroad.

Although it originally aimed not to take any side, it was openly liberal and anticlerical, following the official government policy in those days. It also took advantage of the free press guaranteed by president Reina Barrios, publishing accurate and alarming reports on the economic issues that affected Guatemala at the time due to the large investments in public infrastructure and the plummeting of coffee and silver international prices; it also reported the return of archbishop Ricardo Casanova y Estrada from his exile in Costa Rica who was pardoned by general Reina Barrios after former president general Manuel Lisandro Barillas Bercián expelled him to Cuba in 1887; and finally, informed about the attempts and manoeuvers Reina Barrios made to extend his constitutional mandate beyond 1898 and all the criticism he got for doing that.

The magazine was a pioneer in sports coverage in Guatemala, presenting information about cycling, which by the end of the 19th Century was an exclusive sport practiced only by the country's elite; in every number the section Cycling Notes informed about the latest competitions and showed pictures of the Cycling club members. Even the board of directors of the Guatemalan Cyclist Union was presented in a number: (1) President: Miguel Llerandi – Spaniard immigrant-, (2) Vicepresident: Víctor Sánchez Ocaña – former director of the famed Instituto Nacional Central para Varones, former secretary of the Guatemalan Ambassy in Mexico, and director the National Statistics Office-, (3) trustee: M. Larreynaga – former secretary of the Guatemala Ambassy in the United States and former inspector of public instruction, (4) trustee: Arturo Petrili – Italian entrepreneur-, (5) trustee: José Lizarralde – coffee plantation owner who had just returned to Guatemala from Brussels–, (6) Secretary: Mr. Gavarrete, and (7) Treasurer: José Quevedo V., – military officer and engineer graduated from the Guatemala Military Academy and current Secretary of the College of Engineering of the National University.

=== 1897–98: La Ilustración del Pacífico ===
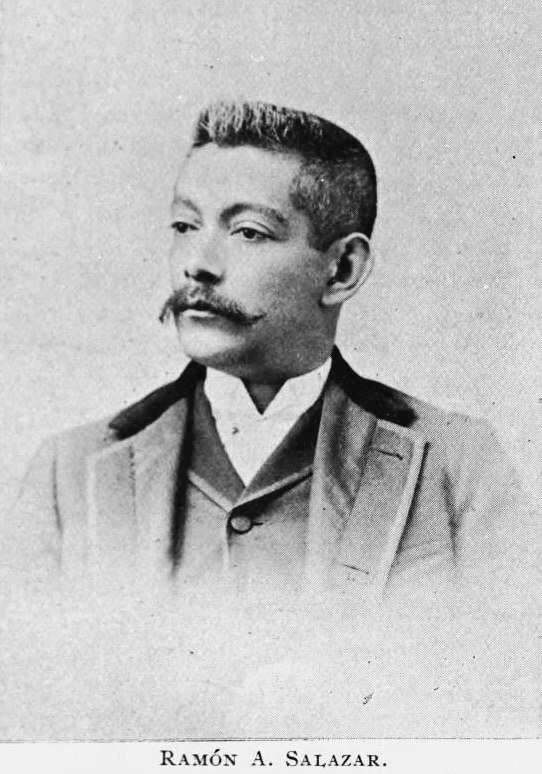
Writer and journalist Ramón A. Salazar, director of La Ilustración del Pacífico in 1897–98.

Towards the end of its first year, the magazine changed its name for La Ilustración del Pacífico (Pacific Ocean Illustration). In the first issue of its second year, the editors wrote about all the issues they had to endure in the first year, and explained that they changed names because they were aimed for a broader audience since they were promised a lot of help and contributions when they first appeared, but none of that materialized and eventually the lost several sponsors due to the increasing costs generated by the economic crisis the country was undergoing at the time. The magazine was also criticized for its report about archbishop Ricardo Casanova y Estrada return – given the Positivism that ruled over the intellectuals at the time – and for publishing the financial situation of the country in 1897, which scared their readers. The economic crisis affected the publisher as well, as the paper costs increased and some special paper needed for the photographs was heavily taxed by the government. In spite of all these problems, they decided to continue because the magazine was used abroad to portray what was happening in Guatemala. Ramón A. Salazar, a well known Guatemalan writer and politician, was the new editor in chief.

== Gallery ==
La Ilustración distinguished itself for showing portraits of the most representative ladies of Guatemalan society, groups of Guatemalan natives from the rural areas and the best students of the different educational institutions in the country. Most of the pictures were taken by photographer Alberto G. Valdeavellano.

=== Socialites ===
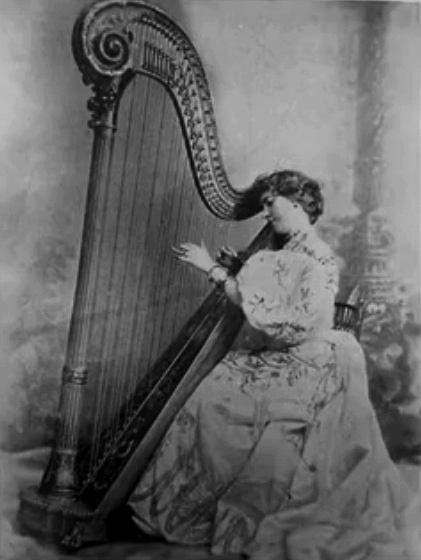
Algeria Benton de Reyna, American artist and wife of general Reina Barrios

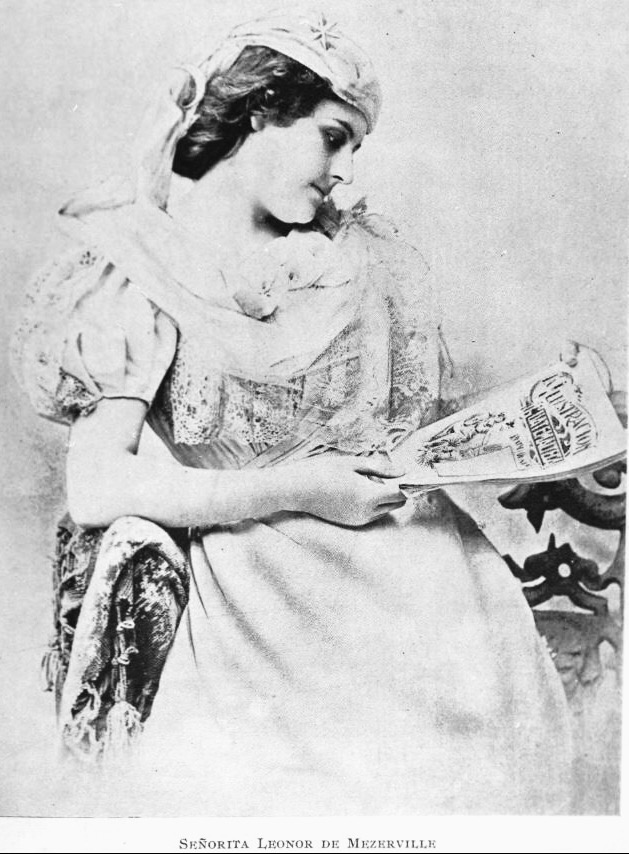
Miss Leonor de Mezerville

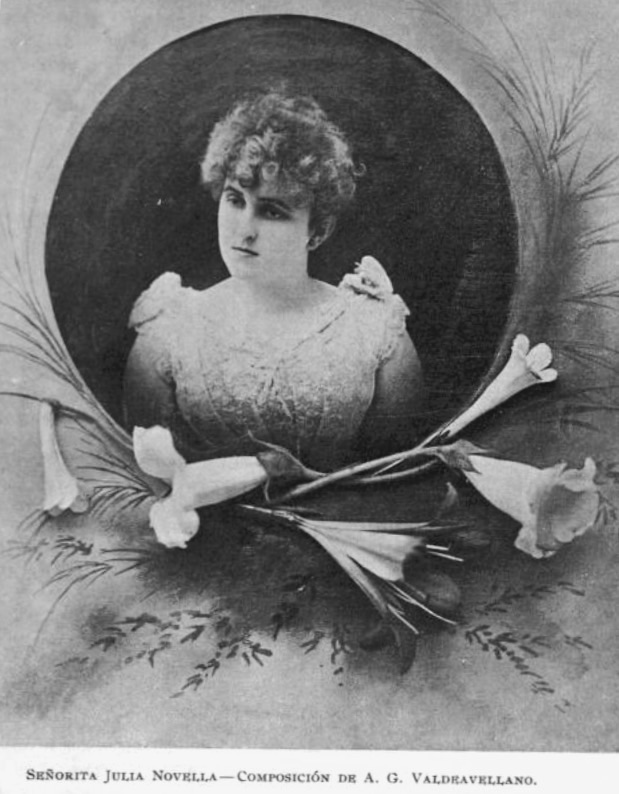
Miss Julia Novella

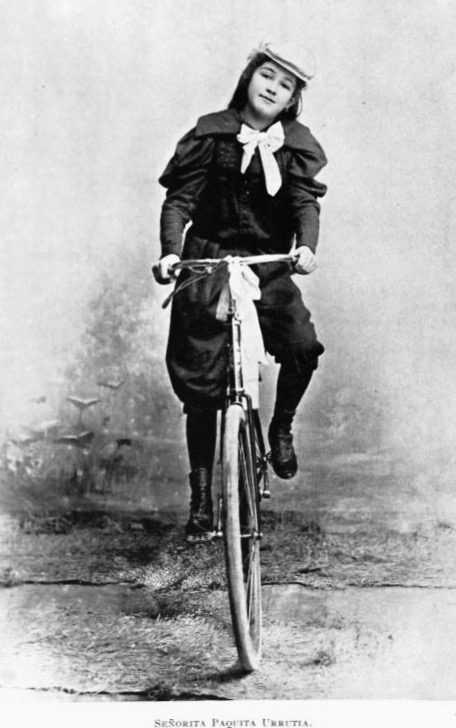
Paquita Urrutia, daughter of well-known engineer Claudio Urrutia

=== Indigenous people from Guatemala ===
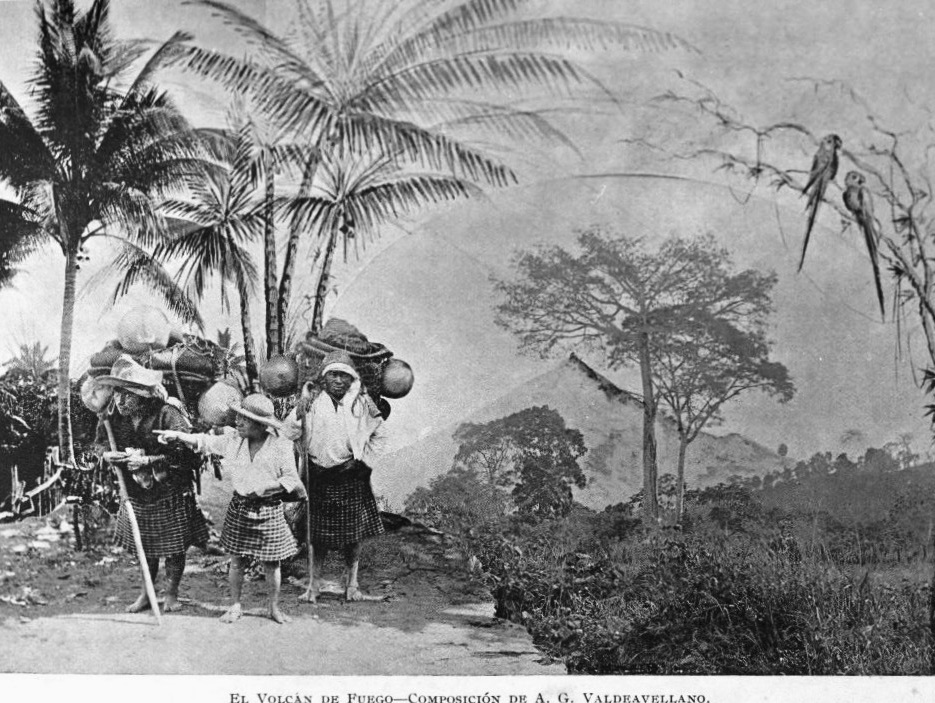
Alotenango, with Volcán de Fuego in the background

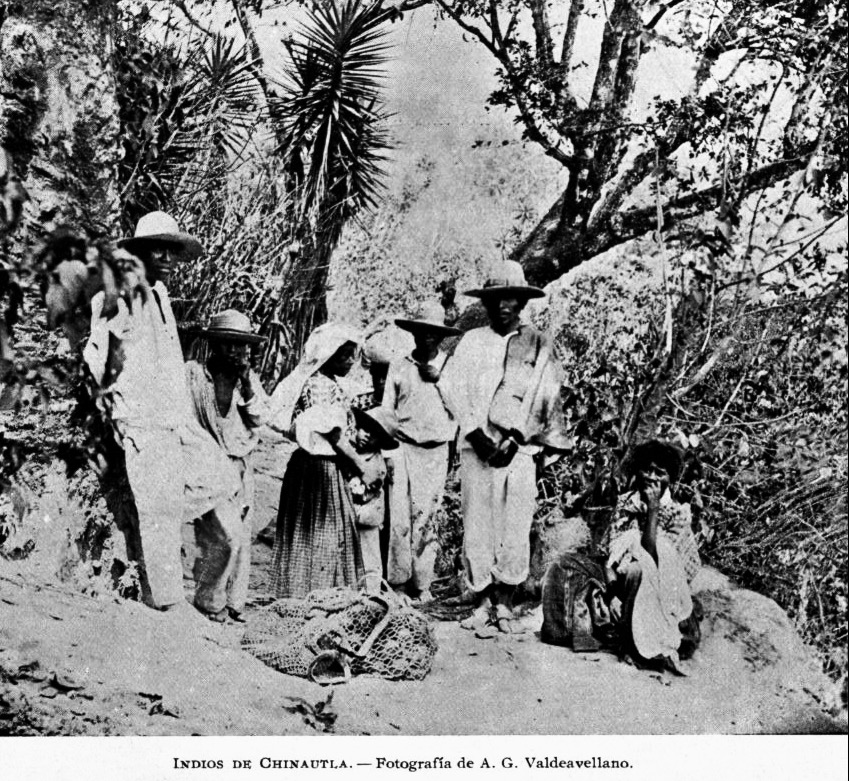
Chinautla

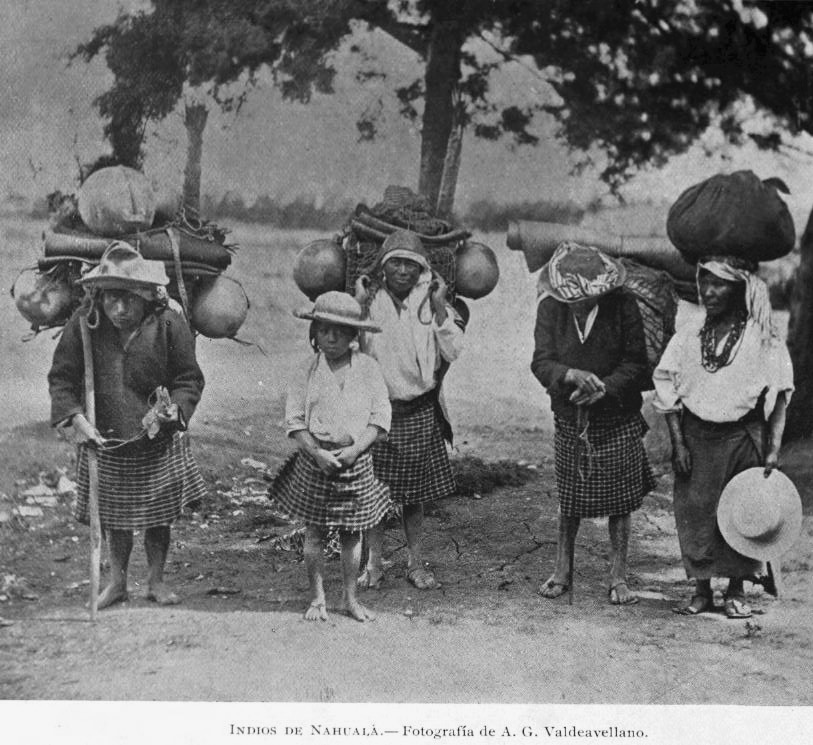
Nahualá

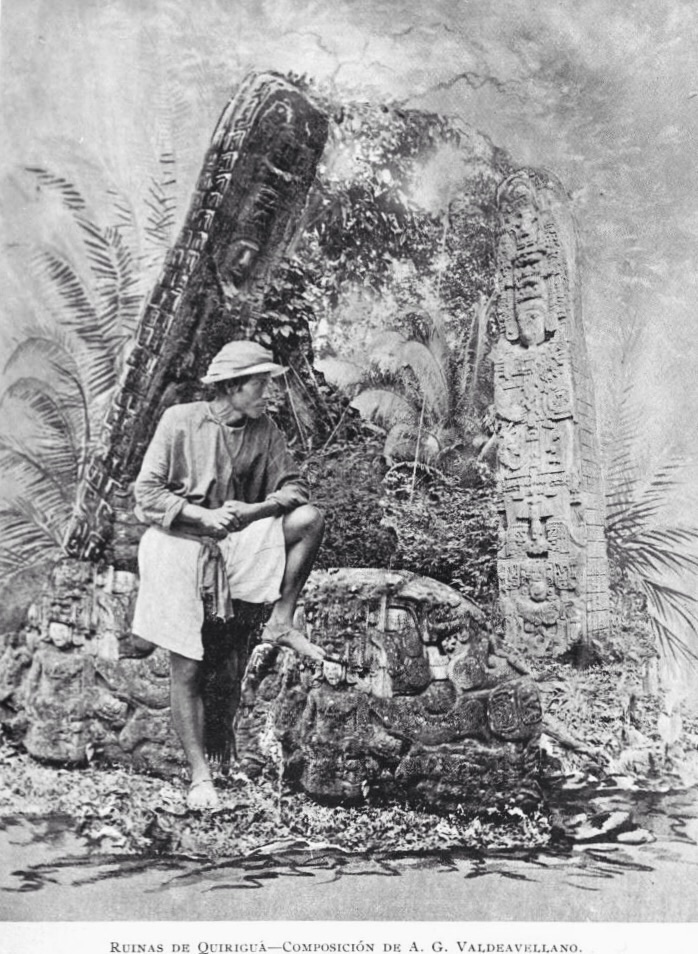
Quiriguá

=== Outstanding students ===
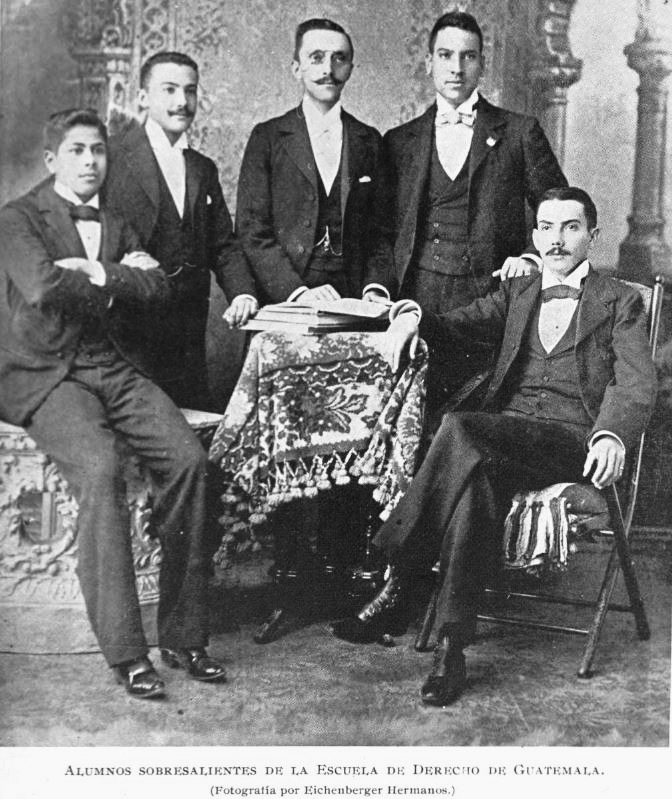
Law Studentes from Universidad Nacional.

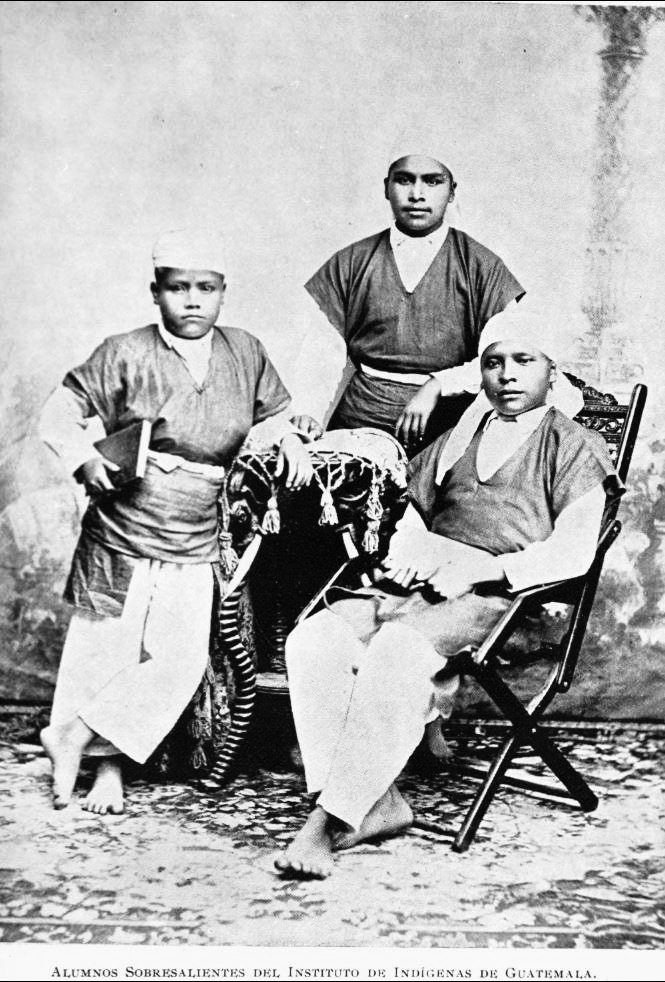
Studentes from the Indigenous Agricultural School

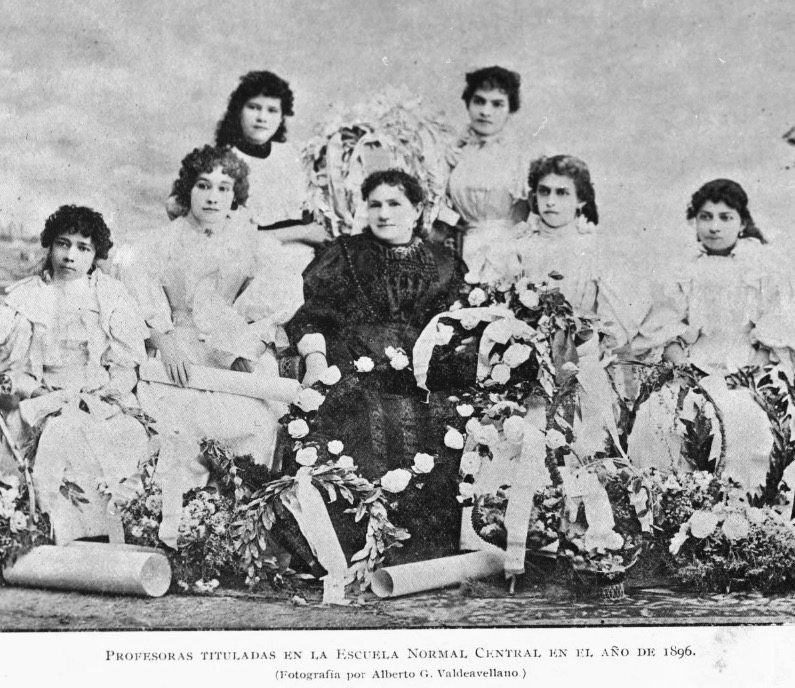
Students from Normal Institute for Ladies

=== General José María Reina Barrios ===
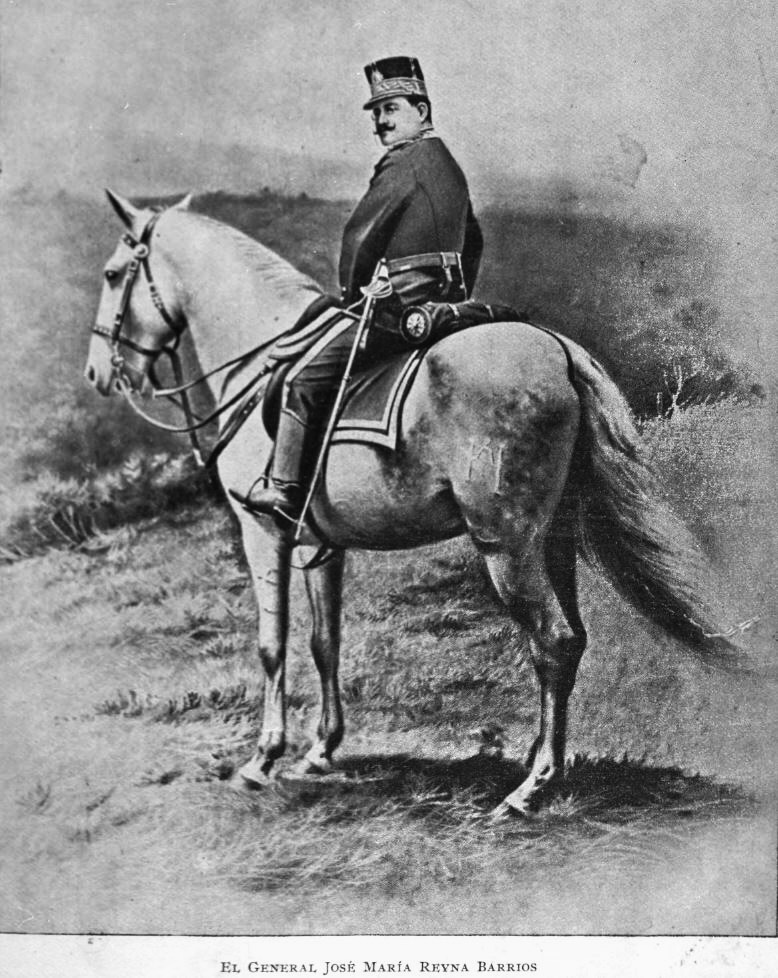
General Reina Barrios during some military exercises on 28 June 1896. This was the first instant photographs ever taken in Guatemala; picture by Alberto G. Valdeavellano.

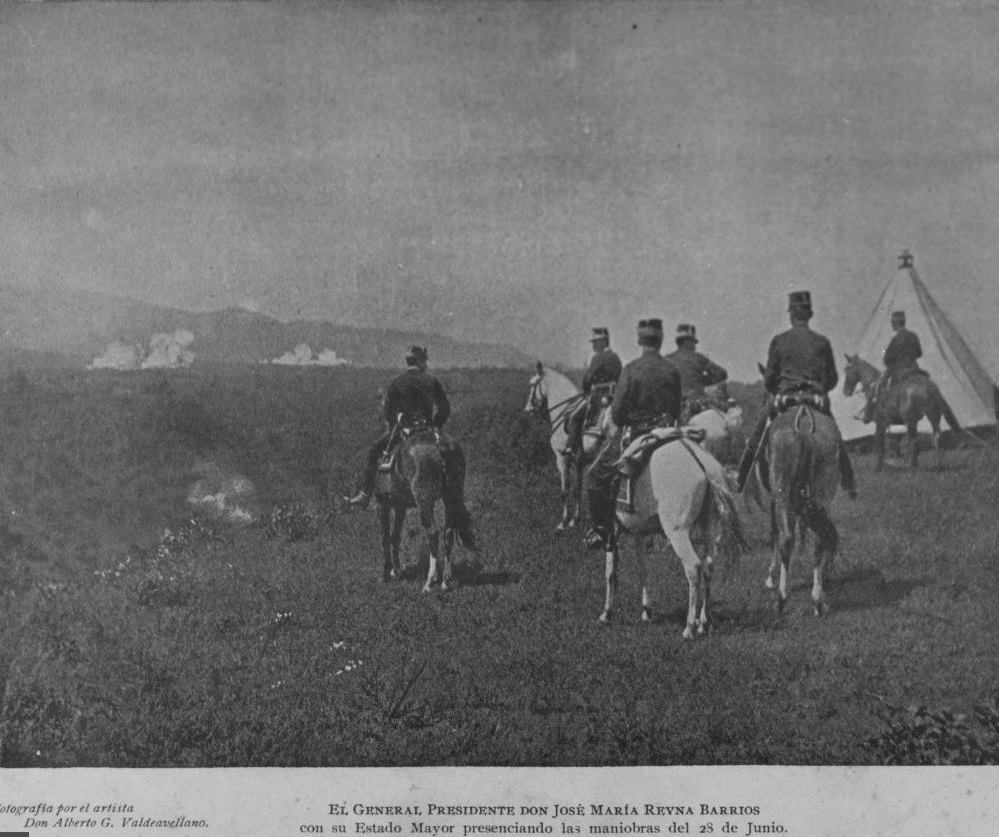
Another perspective of the military exercises.

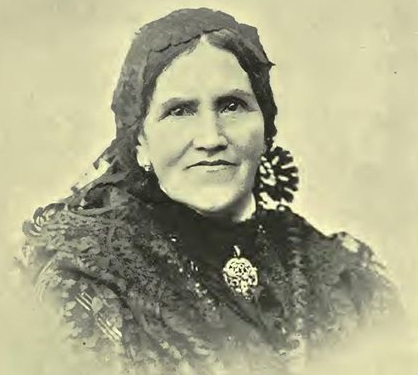
Celia Barrios de Reina, mother of general Reina Barrios and sister of former president Justo Rufino Barrios. 1897.

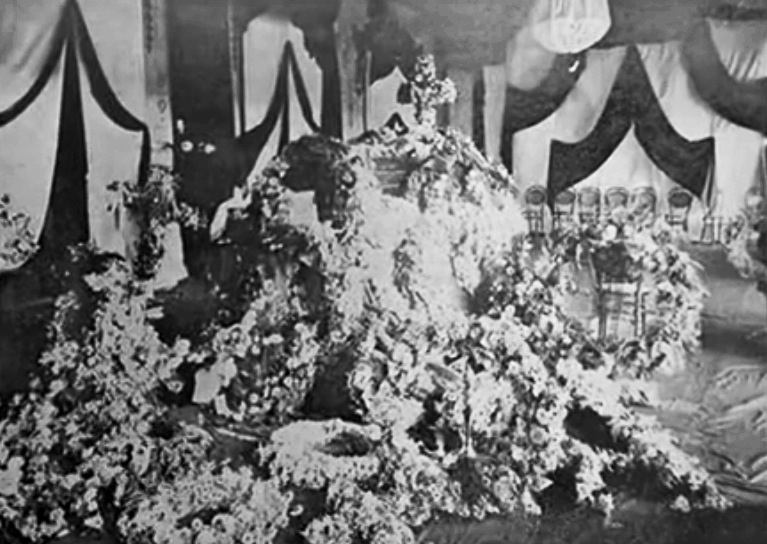
Celia Barrios de Reina's wake. 1897.

== See also ==
- Alberto G. Valdeavellano
- Antonio Macías del Real
- José María Reina Barrios
- Rafael Spinola

== Notes and references ==
=== Bibliography ===
- La Ilustración del Pacífico (1 August 1897). "Editorial: Confirmado". La Ilustración del Pacífico (in Spanish). II (25). Guatemala: Siguere, Guirola y Cía.
- La Ilustración Guatemalteca (1 August 1896). "Nuestro propósitos". La Ilustración Guatemalteca (in Spanish). I (1). Guatemala: Siguere, Guirola y Cía.
- La Ilustración Guatemalteca (15 October 1896). "Notas ciclistas". La Ilustración Guatemalteca (in Spanish). 1 (6). Síguere, Guirola y Cía.
- La Ilustración Guatemalteca (15 March 1897). "Situación Económica". La Ilustración Guatemalteca (in Spanish). 1 (16). Síguere, Guirola y Cía.
- — (1 May 1897). "Ecos de la Prensa". La Ilustración Guatemalteca (in Spanish). I (19). Guatemala: Siguere, Guirola y Cía.
- — (15 May 1897). "Resumen quincenal". La Ilustración Guatemalteca (in Spanish). I (20). Guatemala: Siguere, Guirola y Cía.
- — (15 July 1897). "Puerto de Iztapa". La Ilustración Guatemalteca (in Spanish). I (24). Guatemala.
- Luján Muñoz, J. (2003). Las Revoluciones de 1897, La Muerte de J. M. Reina Barrios y la Elección de M. Estrada Cabrera (in Spanish). Guatemala: Artemis y Edinter. ISBN 9788489766990.
- Macías del Real, A. (1896). "Revista quincenal". La Ilustración Guatemalteca (in Spanish). I (2). Guatemala.
- — (15 February 1897). "Revista quincenal". La Ilustración Guatemalteca (in Spanish). I (14). Guatemala.
- — (1 April 1897). "Ldo. Don Ricardo Casanova y Estrada". La Ilustración Guatemalteca (in Spanish). I (17). Guatemala: Síguere, Guirola y Cía.
- — (1 August 1897). "Resumen Quincenal". La Ilustración del Pacífico (in Spanish). II (25). Guatemala: Siguere, Guirola y Cía.
- — (1 August 1897). "Resumen Quincenal". La Ilustración del Pacífico (in Spanish). II (27). Guatemala: Siguere, Guirola y Cía.
- Valdeavellano, A. G. (15 July 1897). "Señorita Leonor de Mezervillk". La Ilustración Guatemalteca (in Spanish). I (24). Guatemala.
