= Alberto G. Valdeavellano =

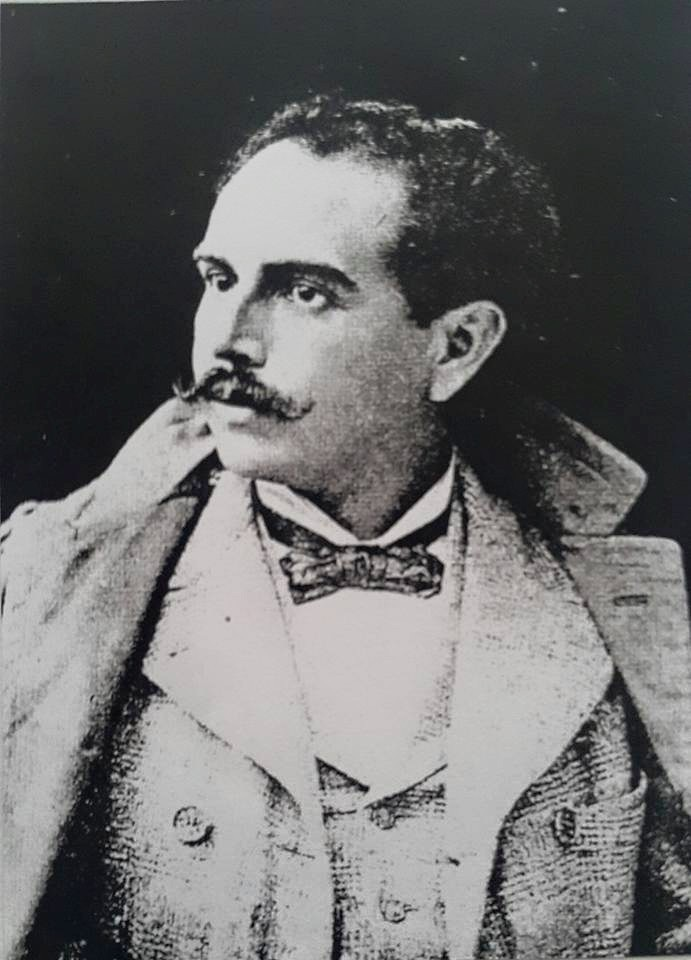
- Born: August 5, 1861; Guatemala City, Guatemala
- Died: July 16, 1928; Guatemala City, Guatemala

Alberto G. Valdeavellano (Guatemala City, 5 August 1861 - Guatemala City, 16 July 1928) was the first landscape and sports photographer of Guatemala.

== Biography ==
Little is known about Valdeavellano family and personal life; his parents got married on 25 October 1851 and had seven children. Valdeavellano was the fourth of the couple's children. He grew up and got educated during the Liberal Reform in the 1870s and 1880s, he became an anticlerical agnostic, something not uncommon for the educated youth of those decades in Guatemala.

He graduated high school at the then prestigious Instituto Nacional for boys, where he was a classmate of Rafael Spínola - who would later become editor in chief of La Ilustración Guatemalteca and La Idea Liberal and eventually secretary of Infrastructure of president Manuel Estrada Cabrera-; Spínola described him in 1896 as a consumed artist that used to draw his classmates and teacher while in class.

Given his talent as a cartoonist and painter, he used it to work on photographic techniques, something that he has in common with most of the photography pioneers in Guatemala, especially in the 19th and early 20th centuries. Valdeavellano learnt his profession from Emilio Herbruger ca. 1880, who owner "Fotografía Imperial" and where he worked together with Juan J. de Jesús Yas and Luis de la Riva Ruiz. After a while, he moved on to work with Eduardo J. Kildare in "Palacio de Artes", when the American photographer left Herbruger's shop.

Towards the end of the 1890s, he worked with an associate in "Fernández and Valdeavellano" under the name of "El Siglo XX" ("The 20th century"). By then he lived in an Arabic style residence in Guatemala City and had a constant stream of socialites that wanted a portrait; some of his best work was published on biweekly basis in the La Ilustración Guatemalteca.

After a trip to Europe, his studio became "El Arte Nuevo" in the 1900s and towards the end of his life, we formed the "Valdeavellano y Bolaños" company, and worked there until his death in 1928.

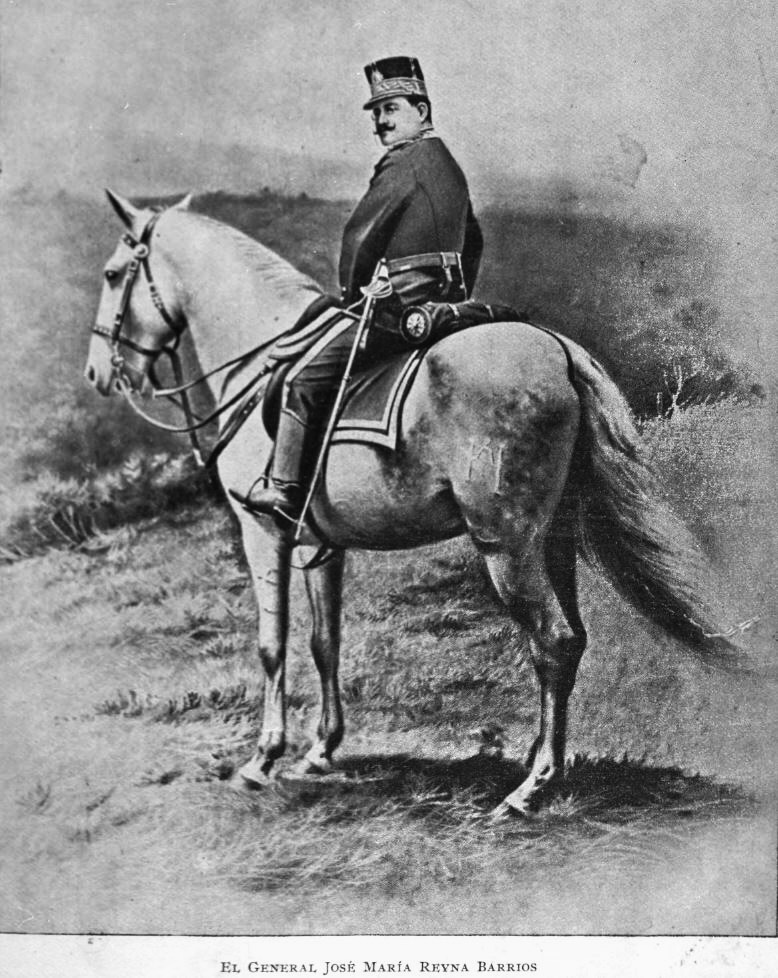
First instant photograph ever taken in Guatemala. Valdeavellano made it on 28 June 1896. It shows then president general José María Reina Barrios observing son military drills in Guatemala City.

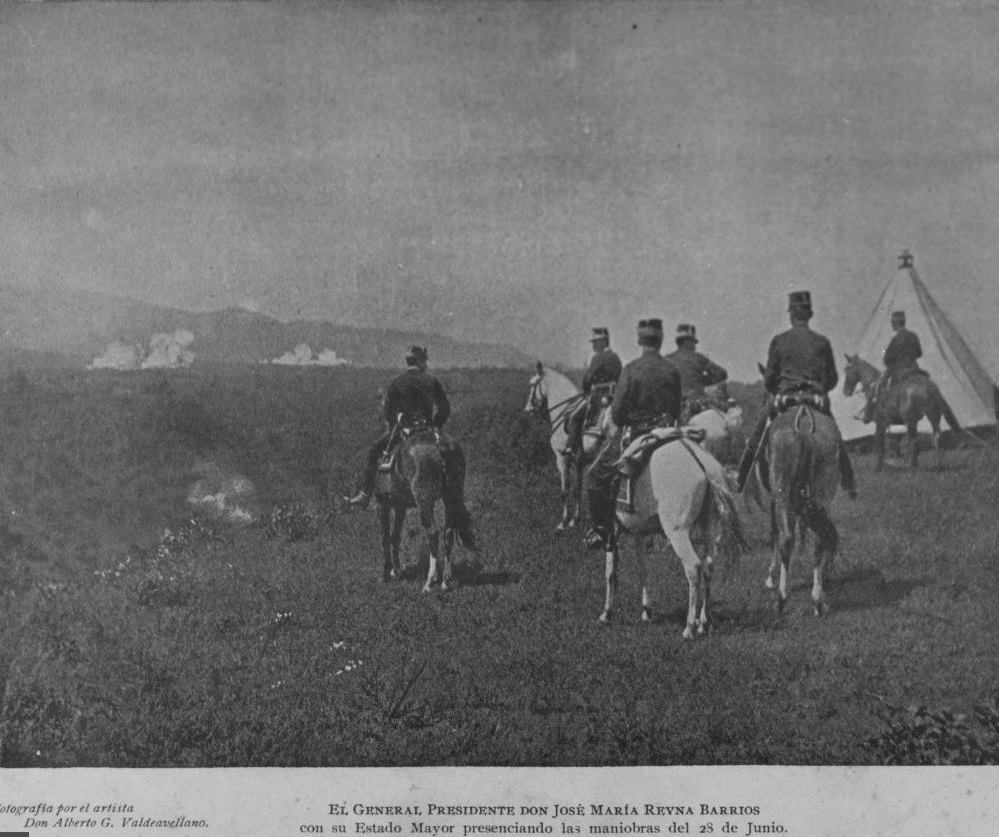
Another photograph of the drills of 28 June 1896. This one shows general Reina Barrios along with his staff.

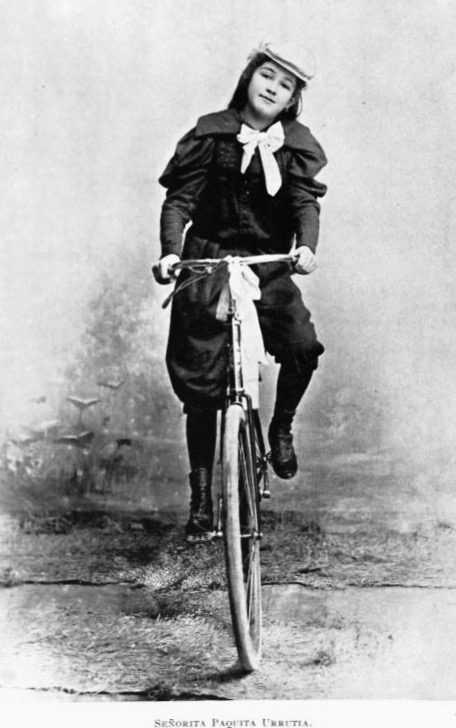
Miss Paquita Urrutia, one of the first female cyclist in Guatemala; she was the daughter of well known engineer Claudio Urrutia.

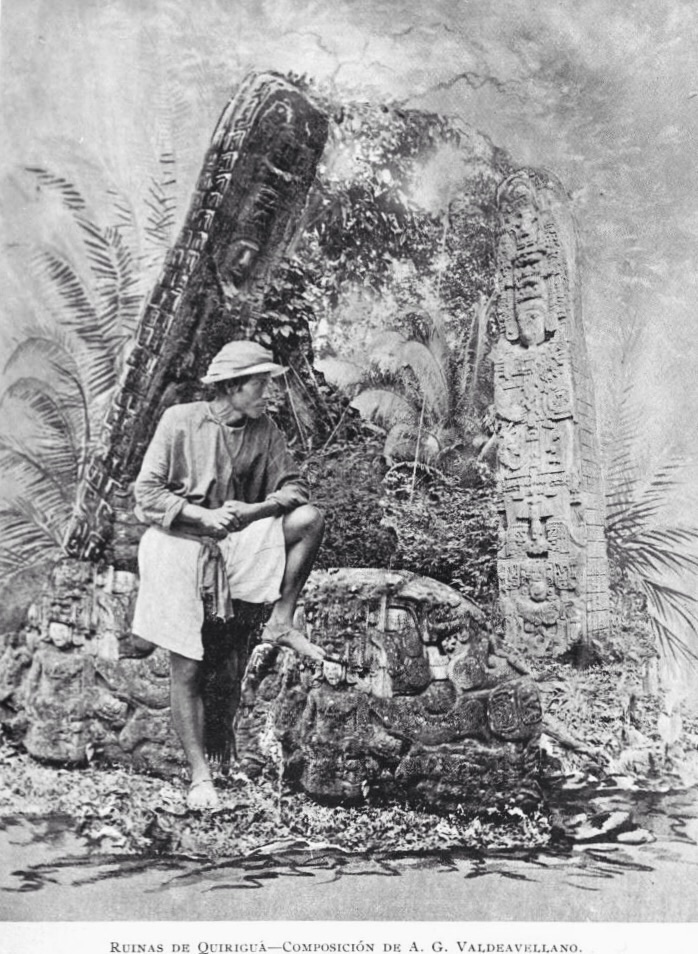
Quiriguá in 1896.

Valdeavellano was a versatile professional photographer which made him the one of choice among the elite and middle classes in Guatemala to make their portraits; he became quite famous and also was the first sports photographers in the country as his cycling pictures show. Several of those sports pictures were published in La Ilustración Guatemalteca between 1896 and 1897. For the first issue of that cultural magazine he took the first ever instant photograph made in Guatemala on 28 June 1896, a picture of president general José María Reina Barrios, on his horse observing some military drills.

He travelled non-stop all across Guatemala capturing the rural landscape, the roads and the railways; he would picture colonial monuments or Maya temples in Quiriguá. He was able to get many images of Guatemala with his lens and made an extraordinary effort of getting them to the public, but in Guatemala and overseas. He printed postcards and posters of the main cities in Guatemala, such as Guatemala City, Quetzaltenango, Antigua Guatemala and Amatitlán.

== Death ==
Died in Guatemala City on 16 July 1928, as a result of a liver problem, in his own home, located on East fourth street #26, across the street from the Santa Teresa Catholic Church. Valdeavellano never married and did not have any children, but led a plentiful family life with his siblings, nieces and nephews.

== Notes and references ==
Bibliography

- Luján Muñoz, Luis (n.d.). Los indígenas de Guatemala vistos por el fotógrafo Alberto G. Valdeavellano (1861-1928) (in Spanish). Guatemala: CIRMA/INGUAT.
- Spínola, Rafael (1896). "En el álbum de A.G. Valdeavellano". La Ilustración Guatemalteca (in Spanish). I (11). Guatemala: Síguere, Guirola y Cía.
- Valdeavellano, Alberto G. (1896). "Fotografías de la Ilustración Guatemalteca". La Ilustración Guatemalteca (in Spanish). I (13). Guatemala: Síguere, Guirola y Cía.
