= Stenhammar =

Stenhammar may refer to:

- Stenhammar (surname), a Swedish surname
  - Wilhelm Stenhammar (1871–1927) composer
- Stenhammar Palace, in Södermanland, Sweden
- 15239 Stenhammar, a main-belt asteroid
