= Tragic Week =

Tragic Week (Catalan: Setmana Tràgica, Spanish: Semana Trágica) may refer to:

- Tragic Week (Argentina), 1919
- Tragic Week (Guatemala), 1920
- Tragic Week (Spain), 1909
