= Jeanne de Tramcourt =

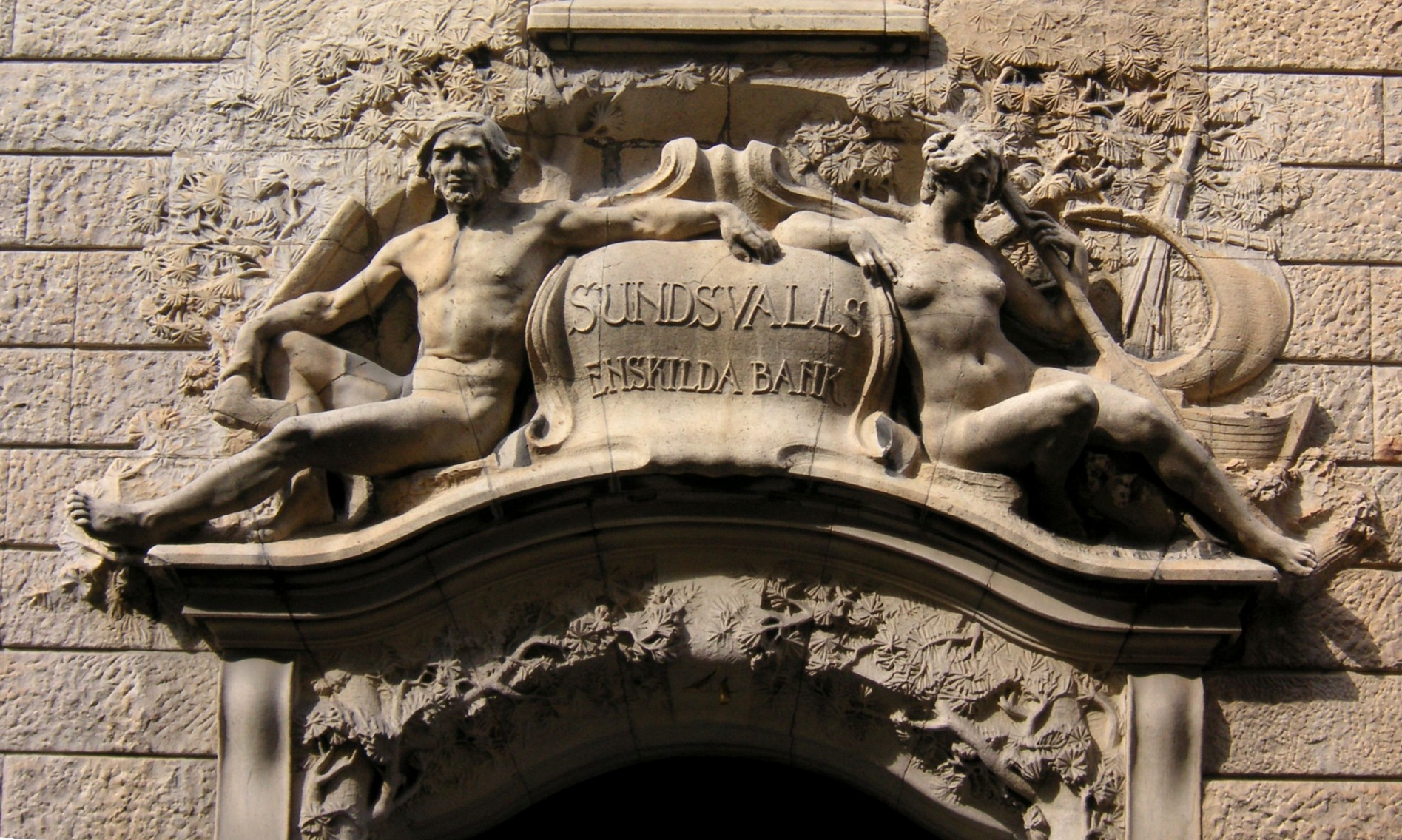
Jeanne de Tramcourt and Nathan Söderblom were the models for the two figures of the portal in Stockholm, sculptured by Christian Eriksson.

Jeanne Léocadie de Tramcourt (9 December 1875, Tracy-sur-Loire, France – 2 January 1952 in Stjärnhov, Södermanland) was the long term French girlfriend of Prince Wilhelm of Sweden. The couple had a relationship from 1914 until 1952.

Tramcourt married Swedish sculptor Christian Eriksson in 1894 and divorced him in 1911, and during her marriage was well known within Swedish art circles. Her relationship to Prince Wilhelm started in 1914 and lasted until her death, with their relationship being described as a happy one. The couple never married but lived together at Stenhammar Palace. From 1932, she was called his "hostess" and their relationship was privately recognized, though never officially, and she was never seen with him in public.

Jeanne de Tramcourt died in a car accident as a passenger while Wilhelm was driving.
