= Stenhammar (surname) =

Stenhammar is a Swedish surname.

== Notable people ==
Notable people with this surname include:

- Christian Stenhammar (1783–1866), Swedish priest and botanist
- Ernst Stenhammar (1859–1927), Swedish architect
- Fredrika Stenhammar (1836–1880), Swedish soprano
- Johan Stenhammar (1769–1799), Swedish poet
- Per Ulrik Stenhammar (1829–1875), Swedish architect
- Wilhelm Stenhammar (1871–1927), Swedish composer

== See also ==
- Stenhammar Palace
