= Prime Minister of Sweden =

Head of government

- Sveriges statsminister
- Coat of arms of Sweden

- Flag of Sweden

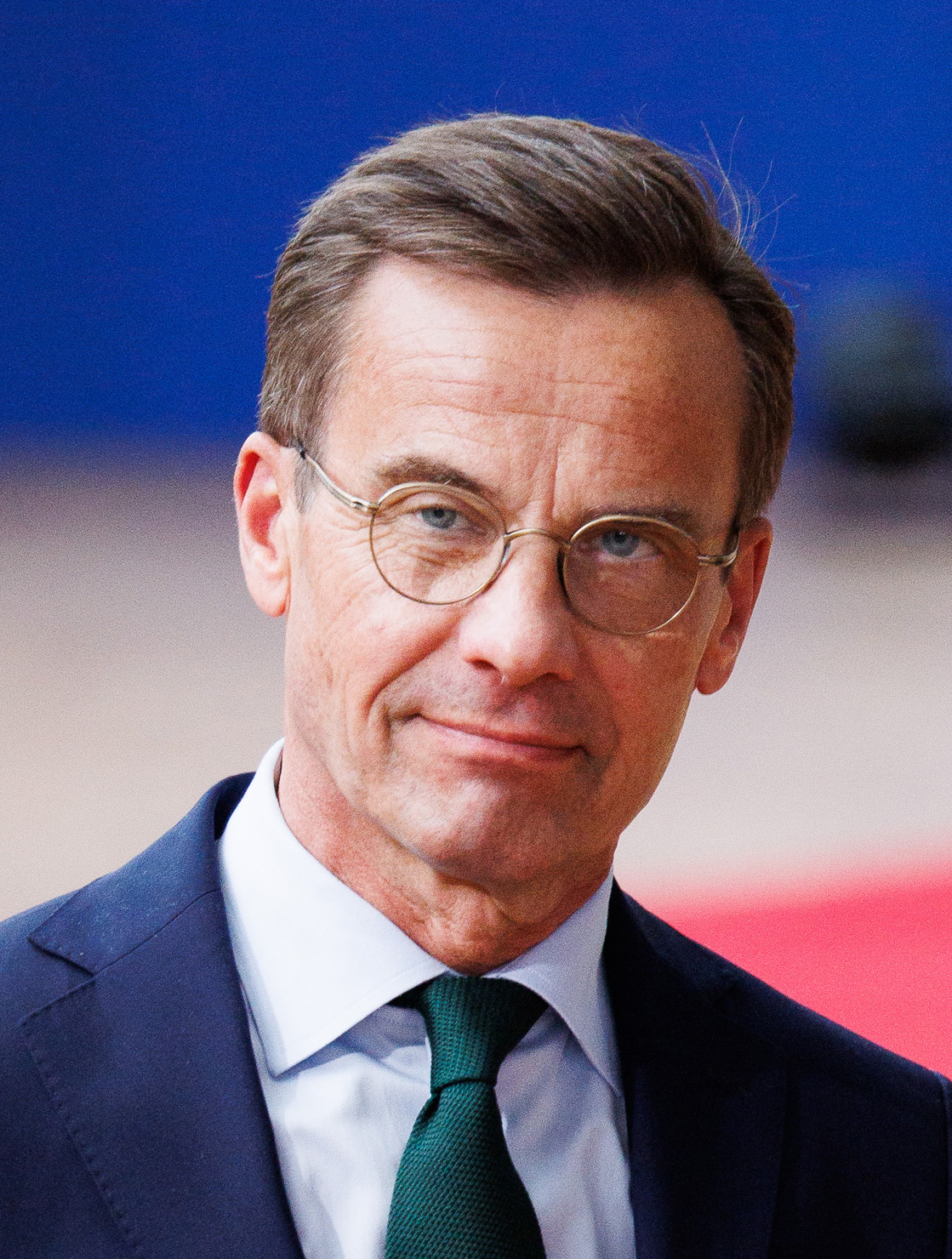
- Incumbent; Ulf Kristersson (caretaker) since 18 October 2022
- Executive branch of the Swedish Government
- Style: Mister Prime Minister (Swedish: Herr Statsminister) (informal); His Excellency (diplomatic)
- Type: Head of government
- Member of: Government of Sweden; European Council; National Security Council
- Reports to: Riksdag
- Residence: Sager House; Harpsund
- Seat: Rosenbad, Stockholm, Sweden
- Nominator: Riksdag
- Appointer: Speaker
- Term length: 4 years (renewable)
- Constituting instrument: 1974 Instrument of Government
- Formation: 20 March 1876; 150 years ago
- First holder: Louis Gerhard De Geer
- Succession: Line of succession
- Deputy: Deputy Prime Minister
- Salary: 204 000 kr monthly
- Website: Prime Minister's Office

Title in Swedish: Herr statsminister

The prime minister of Sweden (Swedish: statsminister, lit. "minister of state") is the head of government of the Kingdom of Sweden. The prime minister and their cabinet (the government) exercise executive authority in the Kingdom of Sweden and are subject to the Parliament of Sweden. The prime minister is nominated by the speaker of the Riksdag and is elected by the chamber by simple majority, using negative parliamentarianism. The Riksdag holds elections every four years, in the even year between leap years.

As with several other similar offices in Europe, the office of Prime Minister came into existence in the nineteenth century as a result of Sweden's democratisation. Prior to the creation of the office, Sweden had no official head of government separate from the King; the country in periods was an absolute monarchy. However, several figures had formerly attained de facto status as leader of the government. Today, the prime minister holds the most influential political role in Sweden.

Unlike most prime ministers in parliamentary systems, the prime minister is both de jure and de facto chief executive. This is because the Instrument of Government explicitly vests executive power in the government, of which the prime minister is the leader. The prime minister has two official residences; these are the Sager House and Harpsund.

== History ==
Historically, the monarchy of Sweden served as both head of state and head of government. Examples like Kings Gustav I, Charles XI, and Gustav III showcase how the Swedish government was structured around the monarchy. However, many of these Kings had powerful domestic advisors who sometimes took on the role of de facto head of government; the most prominent of these examples is Axel Oxenstierna, who played a pivotal role in the formation of the Swedish Empire. The office of Lord High Chancellor was commonly the closest role to a de jure head of government, and they had similar responsibilities to the modern Prime Minister during the so-called Age of Liberty; no governmental offices were called Prime Minister at the time.

At the adoption of the new Instrument of Government of 1809, the two offices of Prime Minister for Justice (Swedish: justitiestatsminister) and Prime Minister for Foreign Affairs (Swedish: utrikesstatsminister) were created, though their roles were no more than just the heads of their respective ministries. When the office of the prime minister was created in 1876, the prime ministers for justice and foreign affairs were thus subsequently demoted to Minister for Justice and Minister for Foreign Affairs. Unlike the minister for justice, the minister for foreign affairs did, however, continue to be styled as "Excellency", an honour shared only with the prime minister. After 1917, it was no longer possible for a monarch to appoint the prime minister and the councillors of state (cabinet ministers) at their own discretion, or keep them in office against the will of the Riksdag. From that time onward, while the King still formally appointed the prime minister, in practice he was required to appoint the leader of the majority party in the Riksdag, or the leader of the senior partner in the majority coalition. While the provision in the Instrument of Government stating that "the King alone shall govern the realm" remained unchanged, it was now understood that the King was required to exercise his powers through the ministers and act on their advice. Over time, the ministers came to de facto exercise the royal prerogatives. However, the Swedish term used for the government during this period was still Kungl. Maj:t, an abbreviation of Kunglig Majestät 'Royal Majesty'.

Until 1974, the executive authority in Sweden had been exercised through the King in Council. Constitutional reform provided a new Instrument of Government which de jure established the parliamentary system and created a cabinet government with constitutional powers not derived from the Crown. At the same time, it stripped the monarchy of even nominal political powers, making the cabinet the country's executive authority in both name and in fact. This codified a number of practices dating from the definitive establishment of parliamentary government in 1917.

== Duties ==
The Instrument of Government requires that the prime minister appoint a member of the cabinet as Deputy Prime Minister, to perform the duties of the prime minister if the prime minister cannot. However, if a deputy prime minister is absent or has not been appointed, the senior minister in the cabinet becomes acting head of government. If more than one minister has equal tenure, the eldest assumes the position (see Swedish governmental line of succession for the present governmental line of succession).

Constitutionally, the prime minister's position is stronger than that of their counterparts in Denmark and Norway. Since 1975, the prime minister has been both de jure and de facto chief executive, with powers and duties specifically enumerated in the Instrument of Government. In the two neighboring Scandinavian monarchies, the monarch is the nominal chief executive, but is bound by convention to act on the advice of the ministers. However, the so-called Torekov Compromise reached in 1971 by the major political parties, codified with the Instrument of Government that went into effect in 1975, stripped the Swedish monarch of even a nominal role in governmental affairs, thus codifying actual practices that had been in place since the definitive establishment of parliamentary government in 1917.

== Process ==
=== Appointment ===
To appoint a new prime minister, the speaker of the Riksdag holds consultations with party leaders to propose a candidate to be submitted for approval to the Riksdag.

The speaker's proposed candidate is then elected through negative parliamentarism. In practice, this means that the prime minister nominee is confirmed if fewer than 175 MPs vote 'no', regardless of the number of 'yes' votes or abstentions. This is described as being "tolerated" by a majority of the Riksdag.

After approval by the Riksdag, the new prime minister-designate must inform the Riksdag which ministers are chosen to make up the new government.

The formal change of government, and thus the start of the term for the new prime minister takes place at a Council of State at the Royal Palace. This is a government meeting chaired by the King, currently King Carl XVI Gustaf. During this meeting, the speaker gives an account of the nomination and election process. The King then announces that a change of government has taken place, finalising the appointment of the new prime minister and their government. The handover of the prime minister's commission has usually taken place in the Riksdag before the Council of State. In 2022 with the appointment of Ulf Kristersson, however, speaker Andreas Norlén handed it over during the meeting of the Council of State after asking for and receiving the King's approval to do so, a pure formality.

=== Resignation ===
Whenever a prime minister resigns, dies, or is forced from office by the Riksdag, the speaker of the Riksdag asks the prime minister (or their deputy) to keep the government as a caretaker government until the new government takes office.

With the exception of the prime minister, cabinet ministers (Swedish: statsråd [ˈstatsroːd]) do not need the approval of the Riksdag, but they can be forced to resign by a vote of no confidence. If the prime minister is forced by a vote of no confidence to resign, the entire cabinet falls, and the process of electing a new prime minister starts. The prime minister can dissolve the Riksdag, even after receiving a vote of no confidence, except during the first three months after an election.

== Amenities ==
=== Office and residences ===
The Government Offices, including the Prime Minister's Office, are located at Rosenbad in central Stockholm, straight across the water from the Parliament House on Helgeandsholmen.

In 1991 Sager House (or the "Sager Palace" as it was previously called) was acquired, and since 1995, it has served as the private official residence of the prime minister.

Harpsund, a manor house in Flen Municipality, Södermanland County, has served as a country residence for the prime minister since 1953. The manor is also frequently used for governmental conferences and informal summits between the government, industry and organisations in Sweden.

=== Salary ===
The salaries of the cabinet ministers, including the prime minister, is decided by and is the subject of annual review by the Statsrådsarvodesnämnden 'Cabinet Ministers' Salary Committee' of the Riksdag. Since 1 July 2025 the prime minister's monthly salary is 204,000 SEK.

== Office and residences ==
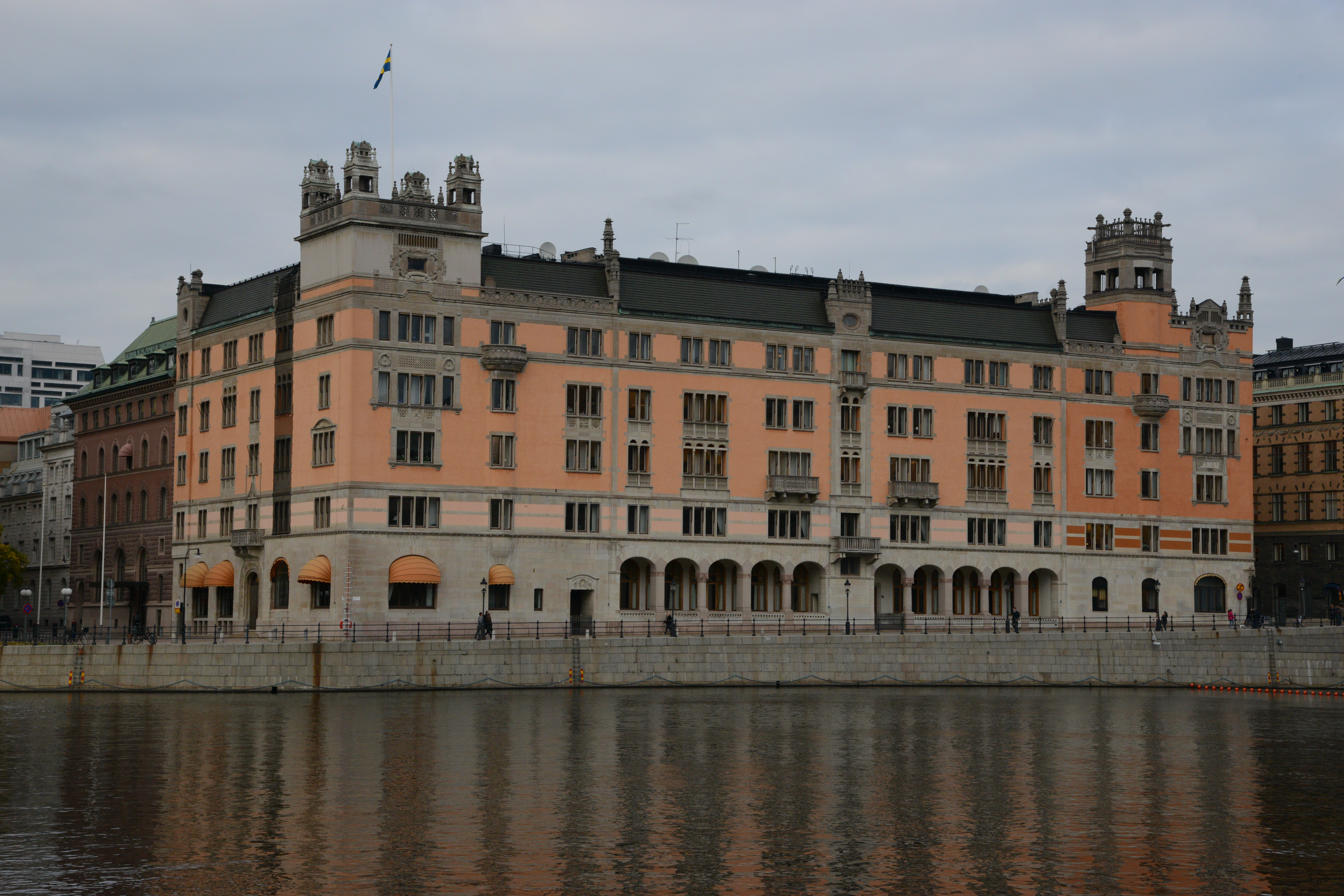
The Rosenbad building has functioned as the Prime Minister's Office since 1981.

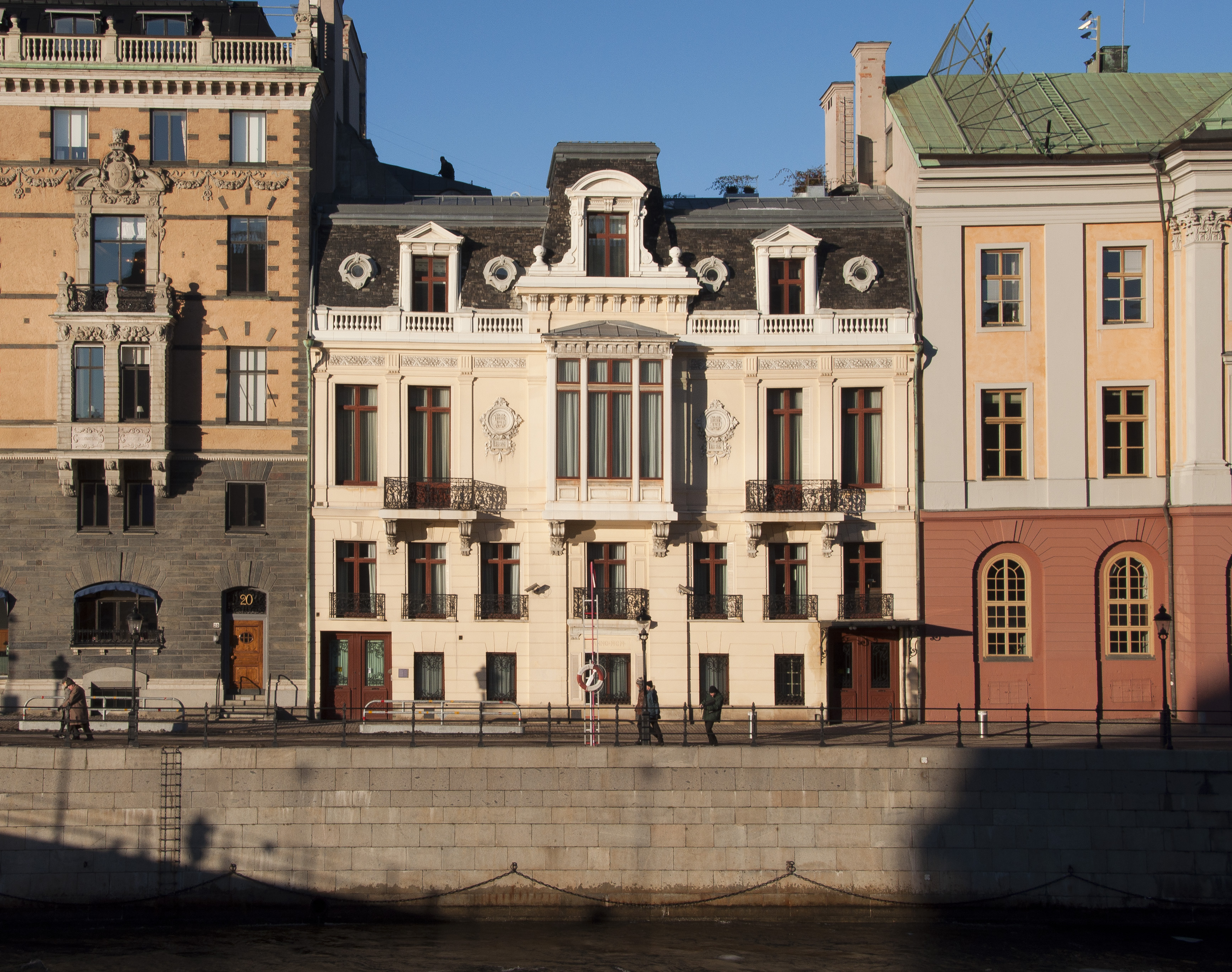
The Sager House is the prime minister's official residence since 1995.

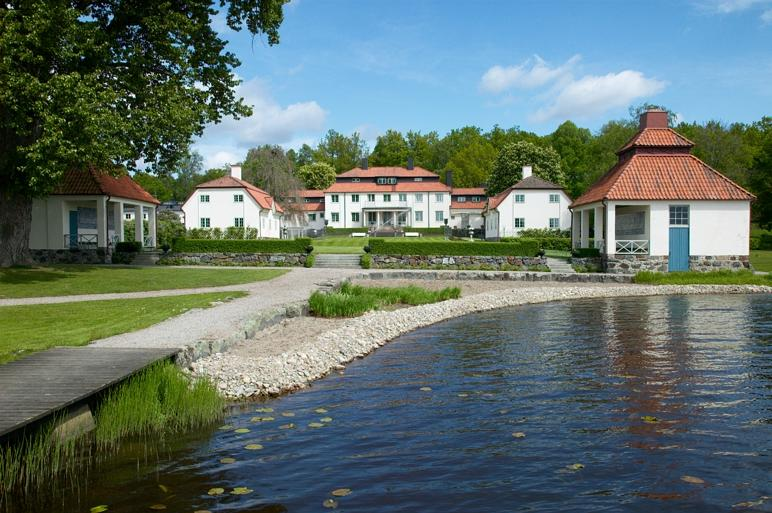
Harpsund Manor has been used as the prime minister's country residence since 1953.

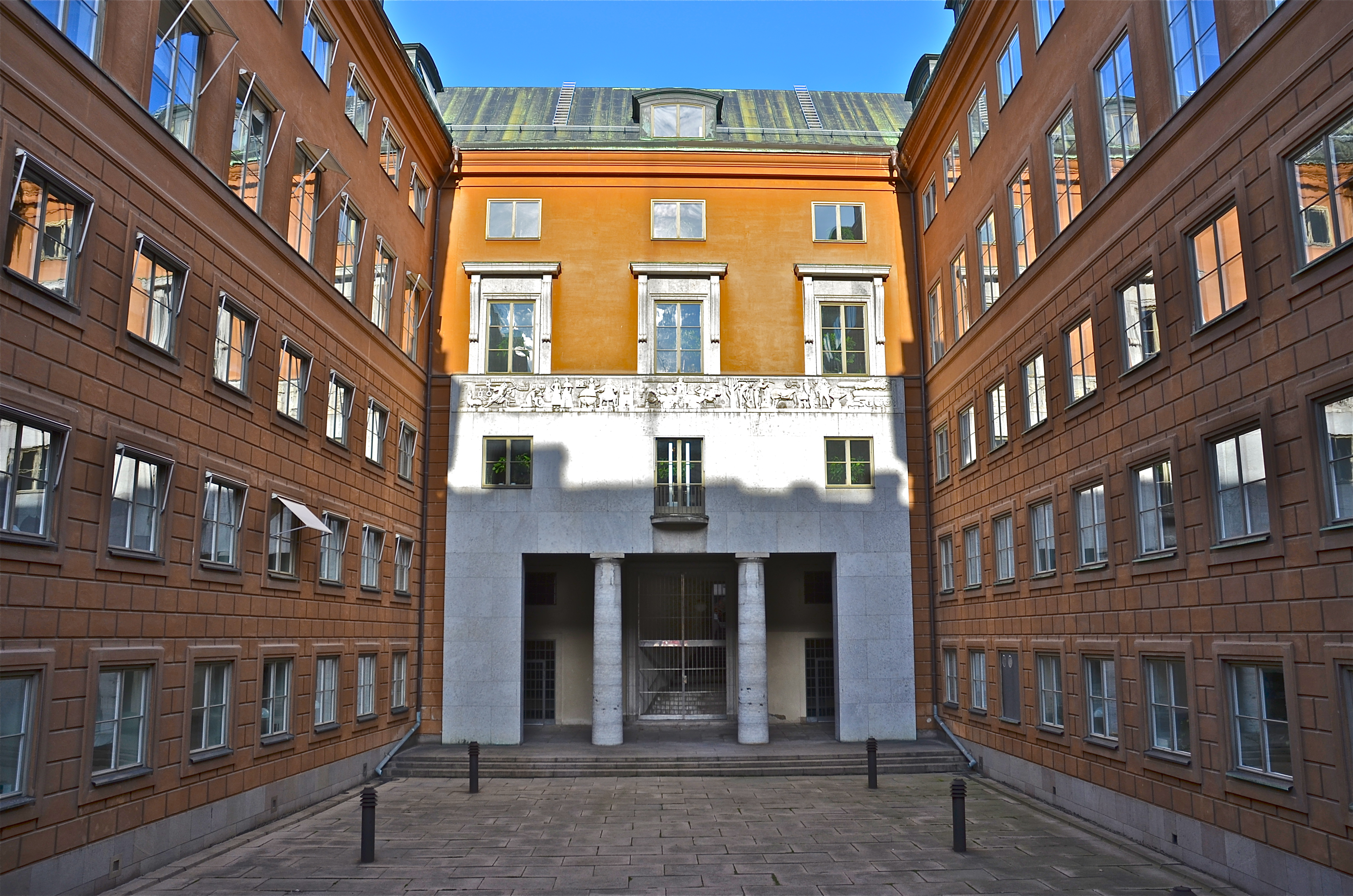
Kanslihuset was where the Prime Minister's Office was located prior to 1981. Nowadays it houses offices of the Riksdag.

== See also ==
- Deputy Prime Minister of Sweden
- Swedish governmental line of succession
- List of prime ministers of Sweden
- List of spouses of prime ministers of Sweden

== Bibliography ==
- The Instrument of Government (PDF). Stockholm: The Riksdag. 2012.
- The Riksdag Act (PDF). Stockholm: The Riksdag. 2012. Archived from the original (PDF) on 1 February 2013.
- Larsson, Torbjörn; Bäck, Henry (2008). Governing and Governance in Sweden. Lund: Studentlitteratur AB. ISBN 978-91-44-03682-3.
- Petersson, Olof (2010). Den offentliga makten (in Swedish). Stockholm: SNS Förlag. ISBN 978-91-86203-66-5.
