= Tragic Week (Guatemala) =

Coordinates: 14.6228°N 90.5314°W

Tragic Week of 1920
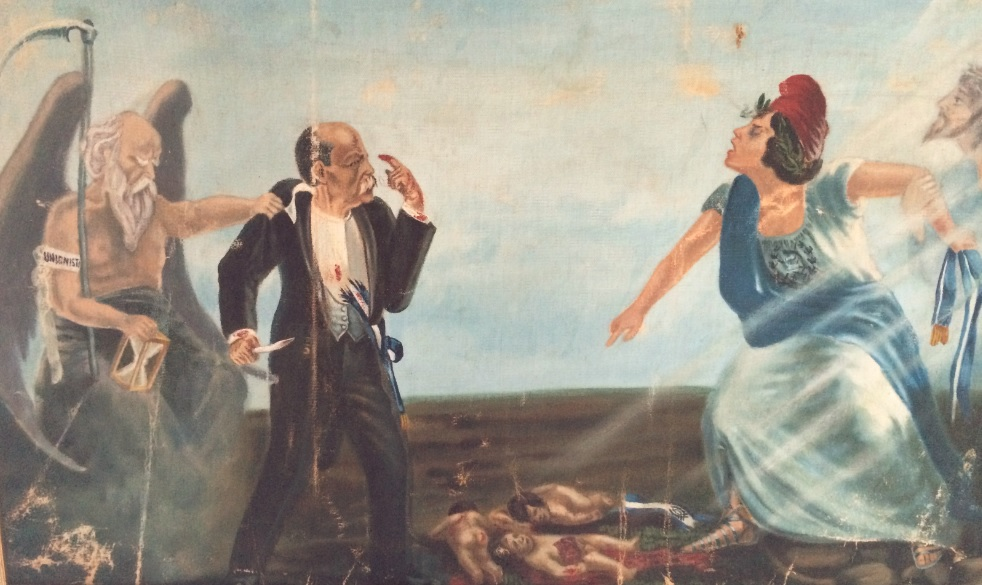
- Time has come for president Estrada Cabrera: the Unionists party take him away after he destroyed Guatemala's children, while Jesus holds Guatemala and reminds her that she must forgive.
- Native name: Semana Trágica de 1920
- Date: April 8, 1920
- Location: Guatemala

The Tragic Week of 1920 was a civil uprising that took place in Guatemala in the week of April 8 to April 14, 1920, led by Unionist Party leaders, student leaders and those who opposed President Manuel Estrada Cabrera when the latter refused to leave office after the National Assembly declared him mentally incompetent for the presidency and named Carlos Herrera as interim president.

== Background ==
=== Unionists Party ===
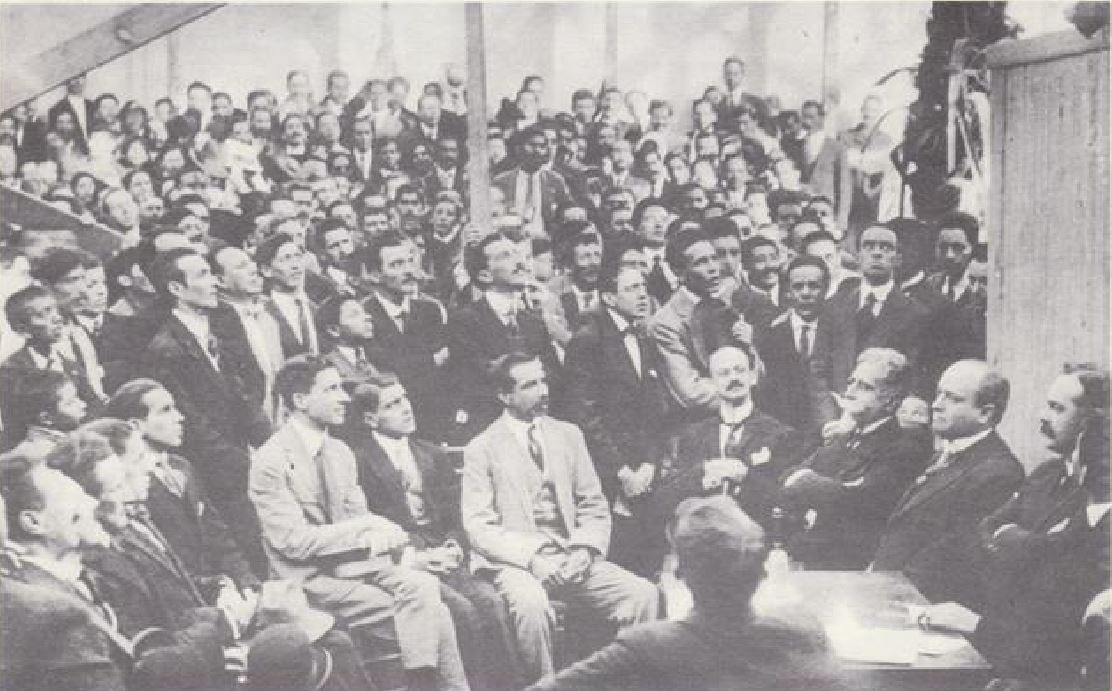
Picture taken inside the People's House -Spanish: Casa del Pueblo- in December 1919, when the Unionists Party leaders signed the Three-fold minutes. Conservative leaders are sitting forefront.

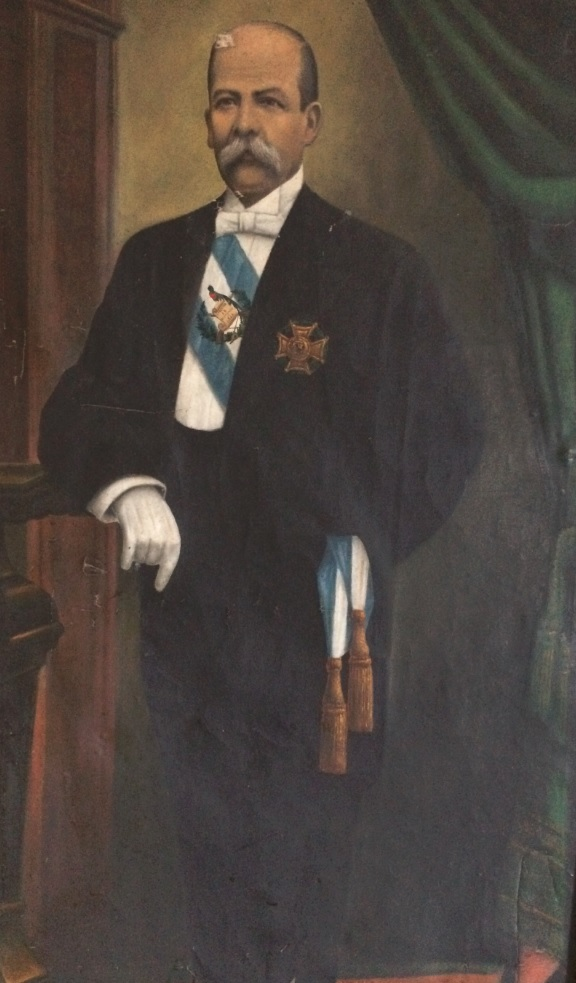
Last official portrait of president Manuel Estrada Cabrera.

Several attacks had been made on president Manuel Estrada Cabrera's life, but fortune had always favored him. Even though he was a civilian, he based his power entirely on the support of the military. By declaring war on Germany during the First World War, he concocted a reason to increase his already well-equipped artillery by the addition of modern field guns, machine guns and ammunition.

Opposition to his regime started after the 1917-1918 earthquakes, as it was evident that the President was incapable of leading recovery efforts. Urged by his cousin, Manuel Cobos Batres, the Bishop of Facelli, Piñol y Batres from the Aycinena family, began preaching against government policies in the San Francisco Church in 1919. For the first time, the Catholic Church opposed the President. (Note: The Catholic Church at the time was very weak and had only the secular clergy left; regular clergy orders had been expelled from Guatemala in 1872 by the liberal regimes of Justo Rufino Barrios and did not return to the country until after the coup against Jacobo Árbenz Guzmán in 1954.) Additionally, Cobos Batres was able to inspire the national sentiment of conservative criollo leaders José Azmitia, Tácito Molina, Eduardo Camacho, Emilio Escamilla, and also Julio Bianchi, into forming a Central American Unionist party and opposing the strong-arm regime of Estrada Cabrera. The Unionist party began its activities with the support of several sectors of Guatemala City society, among them the Universidad Estrada Cabrera students (Note: Universidad de San Carlos was called Universidad "Estrada Cabrera" since 1918.) and the labor associations, who under the leadership of Silverio Ortiz founded the Patriotic Labor Committee.

The new party was called "Unionist", to differentiate it from both the Liberal and Conservative parties and therefore be able to appeal to all "good willing, freedom and democracy loving" men who "dreamed of the Central American Union". The headquarters of the new party were in a house belonging to the Escamilla family which soon was known as "People's House". Tácito Molina wrote a founding declaration for the party, which was signed by fifty one citizens on 25 December 1919 and was later known as the "Three-fold Act" because it had to be folded in three when it was distributed to the citizens of the city. The document was distributed in Guatemala City until January 1, 1920.

=== March 11, 1920 ===
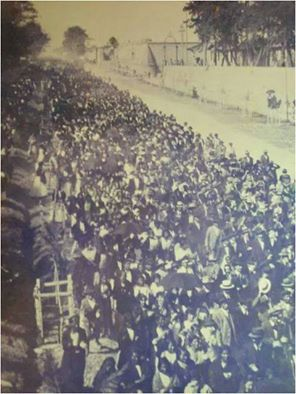
March 11, 1920. After attacking this unarmed and peaceful demonstration, Estrada Cabrera regime began to crumble.

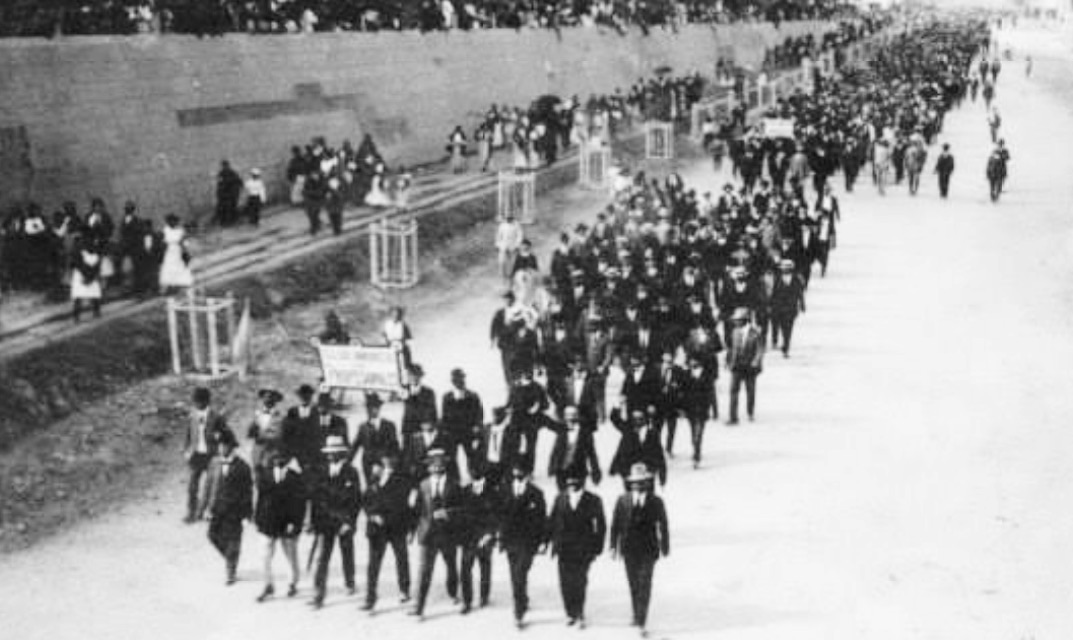
Another picture from March 11, 1920.

Estrada Cabrera was forced to accept the new party due to internal and international pressure. On March 1, 1920, the National Assembly officially accepted the new party. Since then, Estrada Cabrera publicly admitted his willingness to bow to international opinion on opening spaces for political rivals, but kept arresting Unionist sympathizers.

Ever since January, the Unionists had been taking a more threatening attitude - openly challenging the Government; they had also been harassed and imprisoned, but they were treated with less severity than had been previous challengers. It was whispered, however, that if necessary, the whole country would side with the Unionists.

On 11 March 1920, the new party organized a large demonstration against the government, demanding a new government, revision of the laws, administrative reforms, political freedom, and the abolition of press censorship. The National Assembly leaders promised to receive them, but when the procession - numbering several thousand - arrived at the Military Academy, where the National Assembly had moved after the 1917-18 earthquakes, the army fired their machine guns against it, leaving scores of dead and wounded on the ground. This caused a lot of resentment and anger and united the Guatemalan people against the President, who was already detested after two decades of strong-armed rule and, in particular, for his egregious incompetence in leading the recovery after the 1917-18 earthquakes.

=== April 8, 1920 ===
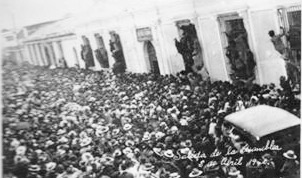
On April 8, 1920, Guatemalan people filled up the street in front of the National Assembly.

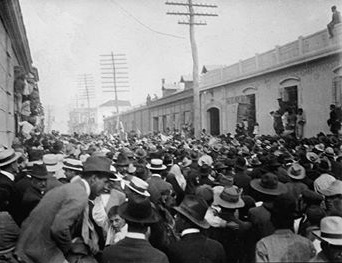
Another picture from the people in front of the National Assembly.

Prince Wilhelm and his companions returned to Guatemala City on April 8, 1920, and he wrote in his book that "there was a sort of feeling in the air as though something was about to happen". The prince had no way to know that in the previous days Unionist leaders Julio Bianchi and Tácito Molina, among others, had struck a deal with Congressional leaders - especially Adrian Vidaurre - that on this day, the National Assembly would declare the President unfit for his high office. Congress assembled in one of the city’s public buildings and requested that ten medical men should be deputized to go to "La Palma" and investigate; the ten departed willingly enough, but being perfectly aware that following instructions would have been a death sentence, they stopped at a nearby corner, waited for a few hours and returned to Congress with their decision: the president is most certainly insane.

Then, President of Congress, Adrián Vidaurre, former Secretary of War and up to that point one of the most important members of Cabrera's cabinet, declared the President insane and unable to continue. He designated Carlos Herrera as interim president.

Herrera, then a representative from his hometown Santa Lucía Cotzumalguapa, had been elected on account of his good repute, his distinguished personal qualities and his great wealth, on the assumption that it would have rendered him less likely to enrich himself at others' expense.

Soon, great masses of people were marching through the streets shouting and waving and congratulating one another. Cars and other vehicles packed with passengers drove back and forth. Some added the clatter of tin cans and braying of toy trumpets to the noise, while in government buildings and barracks the soldiers simply looked on. Most of the soldiers had been bought off and had promised to remain neutral until the dust settled.

But Estrada Cabrera was not done yet; upon learning of his diagnosis, he simply said: "Loco, ¿eh? ¡Ya verán su loco!" -"Mad, huh? They will see their madman!"-.

== Tragic week April 9–14, 1920 ==
=== April 9, 1920 ===
Cabrera resisted this designation and settled for a fight from his residence in "La Palma", which was a large enclosed area with roads crossing both ways, without civilizing aspects such as a park or garden. There was a clutter of small buildings painted in the crudest of colors; each house appeared to have been built for a particular purpose: one was the dining room, another the kitchen, a writing room, and so on. The sun beat down on the barren compound, which had little open space, but had wonderful landscapes painted on the walls. At a little distance were thatched huts with a lone broad bench that servants and soldiers used as both a table and a bed.

On April 9, 1920, Guatemala City was awakened with machine-gun fire and shelling in every quarter of the city. In "La Palma" French field-howitzers and seventy-fives with anti-aircraft sights, quick firing guns and machine guns were drawn. Meanwhile, in Guatemala City streets were deserted and bloodshed commenced in earnest. The Unionists were caught off-guard: they were disorganized and they had almost no weapons, but they quickly remedied the situation: Government buildings were systematically plundered and they gathered arms and ammunition from the most unlikely places. They armed themselves with knives, machetes, saloon rifles, shotguns, axes and crowbars. They enthusiastically raised barricades and dug trenches in the streets.

At first, friends as well as enemies were attacked, but after white badges bearing the name "Unionista" were distributed, the fire was more effective. A few hours later most men of the city were wearing that token in their hat, and there were even some that had a portrait of the new president on their chest. On the government side, steady fire was maintained from "La Palma" and the two forts of San José and Matamoros. Cars with the Red Cross flag dashed incessantly, nurses rode the running boards, each with medical supplies in one hand and a machete stuck in her belt.

The combat left water lines and electric cables damaged, leaving the city in darkness from the first night on; telephone and telegraph were also out of order. Bullets whistled about and the wildest rumors were the only source of news. owing to modern weaponry, it was a revolution hard fought.

=== April 10–13, 1920 ===
During these days there was reason to fear that the Cabrerists might attempt to outflank the city and fall upon the revolutionaries from the rear, causing each to defend himself as best he could in the confusion; and several times a truce was proclaimed, only to be broken a few minutes later. Prince Wilhelm and his companions remained at the Hotel, which thanks to its solid walls and corrugated iron roof, withstood the rain of rifle bullets and shrapnel. Earth from patio flower tubs was stuffed into sacks to build a bomb-proof shelter for women and children. Old tram-lines from the street outside were torn up and used to reinforce the roof. Finally, using debris from a nearby demolished building - destroyed by the 1917-18 earthquakes- the guests were arable to barricade the main entrance to the building.

The first couple of days, one ducked and ran as fast as one could across a street, but later one took things more calmly, and waited till the fire slackened. Plundering was rampant: A store across the street from where the Swedish prince was staying was ransacked. Finding the looters had left a Venezuelan flag, the prince Fashioned it into a crude Swedish flag that flew from a hotel window for the duration, notifying both sides that it was a foreign legation.

=== April 14, 1920 ===
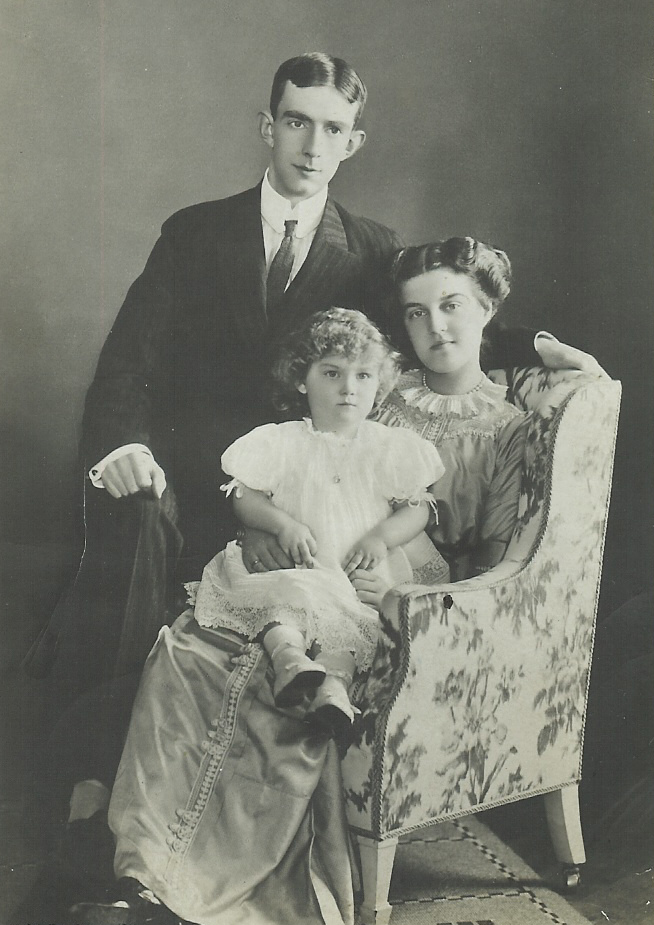
Prince Wilhelm of Sweden in a family portrait. The prince was in Guatemala during the Tragic Week and wrote his experiences from it in his book Between two continents.

Combat lasted until San José fort fell. When the fort’s hungry defenders were bought off, "La Palma" was indefensible. By the following afternoon, the revolutionaries were absolute masters of the situation. The firing gradually ceased and Estrada Cabrera surrendered, along with the remainder of his forces, numbering about five thousand.

== Aftermath ==
When the fighting ended, the damage was not as widespread as initially thought, with San José and the Central Prison suffering most of it. Those buildings were near each other and the surrounding houses were peppered with bullets and the streets partly torn up. The Infant's Asylum was hit by a shell, killing about thirty mothers and their newborns.

In "La Palma", the former garrison marched out as prisoners of war. All were well-nourished and relaxed and took their belongings on their backs. Meanwhile, Estrada Cabrera was transported to the Military Academy under diplomatic escort. Once evacuated, plundering commenced; officers looked the other way as the looting was beyond their control and everybody got all they could. In a few hours, every article of value had vanished; even sheets of roofing and bits of window hardware were wrenched off. The elegant landau that had belonged to the president was stolen, along with its purebred mules.

Matamoros fort lacked any strategic advantage. Rafael Carrera had it built in the "Candelaria Barrio" - practically within the city - solely because that was his birthplace. However, its walls, arranged in a star formation, had gun emplacements at every loop-hole, angle and tower; from little Colt machine guns to big 12 cm. Krupp guns from 1877. The defenders had fired every weapon and had left them all pointed towards the city. On the wall of the commandant's quarters hung a detailed artillery map of the city and, close by, Estrada Cabrera's last order - dated six days previously - for the establishment of an extra telephone line to "La Palma". Six great cellars were piled high with heaps of ammunition and the powder kegs stood in long rows; a paper on a door leading to the smaller chambers proclaimed that there were four million rounds of machine gun ammunition. There was also an abundant supply of flour, though the supply of meat had run out when the last mule was shot.

San José fort was in similar situation to that of Matamoros, except that the ammunition had been dispatched more recklessly; the ground was so littered with empty cases that it was difficult to walk. Given the large ammunition at the ex-president's disposal, it was remarkable that he surrendered so soon; but the troops were unreliable, deserting in great numbers to the Unionists at every opportunity. Several hundred went missing every night during the Tragic Week. Afterwards, those caught trying to escape were killed on the spot by their officers. The troops still fighting were weakened by hunger, not because of lack of supplies, but rather due to miserable management of the commissariat.

Several attempts were made to take the Military Academy by force and to lynch the former president, but they all were strongly repelled by the Unionist guards as the party leaders were determined to return to a democracy ruled by law as soon as possible. Even so, they failed to prevent an angry mob from lynching twelve Cabrerists with clubs and machetes in Central Square. Nor could they prevent arsonists from destroying the central railway station; thick, suffocating clouds of smoke poured over the city, literally obscuring the sun. Civic leadership regained control and three days later, Guatemala city had resumed its normal appearance. There was no victory celebration; citizens were busy rebuilding, treating the thousands wounded, and mourning the 800 killed.

== Estrada Cabrera loyal adherents until the end ==
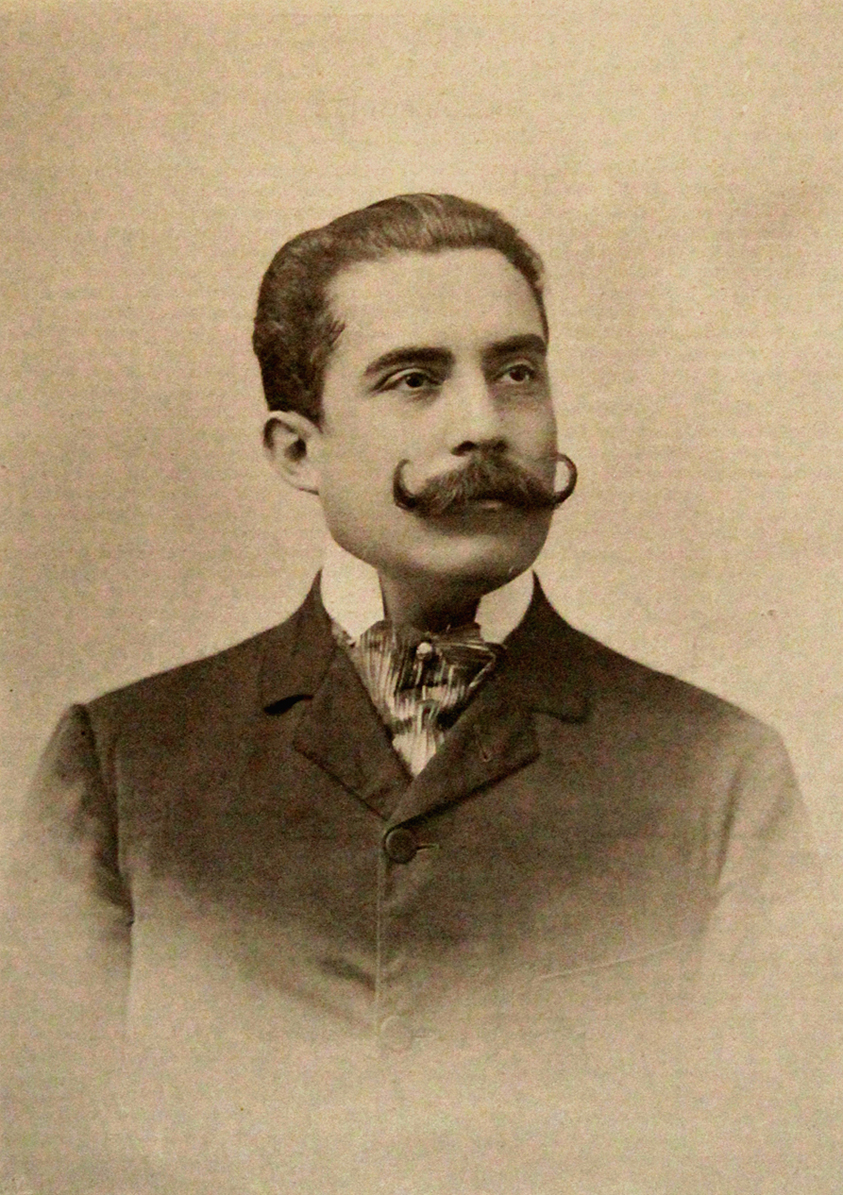
José Santos Chocano, Peruvian poet, diplomat and politician, was the only ally that Estrada Cabrera had on his last day as president.

Estrada Cabrera finally surrendered on April 14, 1920, along with his only loyal friend, Peruvian poet José Santos Chocano.

The people whose portraits are shown here were captured along with Estrada Cabrera after he surrendered in La Palma or were killed during the "Tragic Week" events. They are, according to the number written on their picture: 1. Manuel Estrada Cabrera; 2. Lieutenant Colonel Eduardo Anguiano: killed in combat.; 3. Juan Viteri: Cabrera loyal minion and assassin. He was the son of Juan Viteri, whom Cabrera had killed in 1908 along with his brother Adolfo; he was in prison for several years and once he was released, he became a loyal servant to the president.; 4. General J. Antonio Aguilar: Chief of Police of Antigua Guatemala. Died in prison on May 10, 1920.; 5. Manuel Echeverría y Vidaurre: one of the president’s aides. He was the only one able to flee the country.; 6. Máximo Soto Hall: wealthy poet and politician who spent most of the Estrada Cabrera years writing in his honor.; 7. Col. Miguel López -Col. "Milpas Altas"-: Commander of Matamoros Fort. He was responsible for bombing Guatemala City during the Tragic Week and was lynched by an angry mob in the Central Square on April 15, 1920.; 8. Col. Salvador Alarcón: Commander of Totonicapán. Died in that department on May 10, 1920.; 9. Franco Gálvez Portocarrero: Estrada Cabrera aide and unconditional servant. Was lynched in the Central Square on April 16, 1920.; 10. Lieutenant Colonel Roderico Anzueto: in 1908 he was one of the cadets that denounced his classmates to the government when they tried to kidnap the President. After he was released from prison, he rejoined the Army and was President Jorge Ubico Castañeda’s Chief of Police; 11. Alberto García Estrada: Second in Command of Matamoros Fort who also coordinated the city bombing. Lynched in Central Square on April 15, 1920.; 12. José Félix Flores, Jr.: Eduardo Anguiano’s friend 13. José Félix Flores: died in combat on April 13, 1920.; 14. Luis Fontaine: French citizen. He was a servant of the President and died in combat on April 10, 1920.; 15. Mayor José María Mirón: died on April 15, 1920.; 16. Mayor Emilio Méndez: Prison Director. Died in combat in Chimaltenango on April 10, 1920.; 17. Ricardo Sánchez: a relative of the President; 18. Gregorio González: Second Police Chief. He killed himself on April 9, 1920.; 19. Mayor Julio Ponce: died in combat on April 8, 1920.
Other close collaborators were: 1. Manuel Estrada Cabrera; 2. General José Reyes: Chief of Staff during the Tragic Week; 3. General J. Claro Chajón: Army Commander in Chief and coordinator of the attacks on Guatemala City during the Tragic Week; 4. Col. Rafael Yaquián: Urban Police Chief; 5. Gorge I. Galán: Secret Police Chief; 6. José Santos Chocano: Peruvian poet and close friend of the President; 7. General Miguel Larrave: Mazatenango Commander in the Army; 8. Brigadier Juan P.F. Padilla: La Palma Commander of Defense; 9. J. Sotero Segura Alfaro: secret police agent 10. Manuel María Girón: government official 11. Jesús F. Sáenz: First Secretary to the President; 12. Col. Angel Santis: friend of the President; 13. Felipe Márquez: Estrada Cabrera’s secret agent 14. Gerardo Márquez: son of Felipe Marquez and a convicted murderer 15. Col. Manuel de León Arriaga: Second in Command of the Army Artillery; 16. Gilberto Mancilla: Coronel Eduardo Anguiano’s aide 17. Col. José Pineda Chavarría: Director of the Post Office; 18. Heberto Correa: university student and secret police undercover agent 19. Lieutenant Colonel Carlos de León Régil: police officer 20. Andrés Largaespada: writer who defended the President in the newspapers 21. Brigadier Enrique Aris: secret police agent

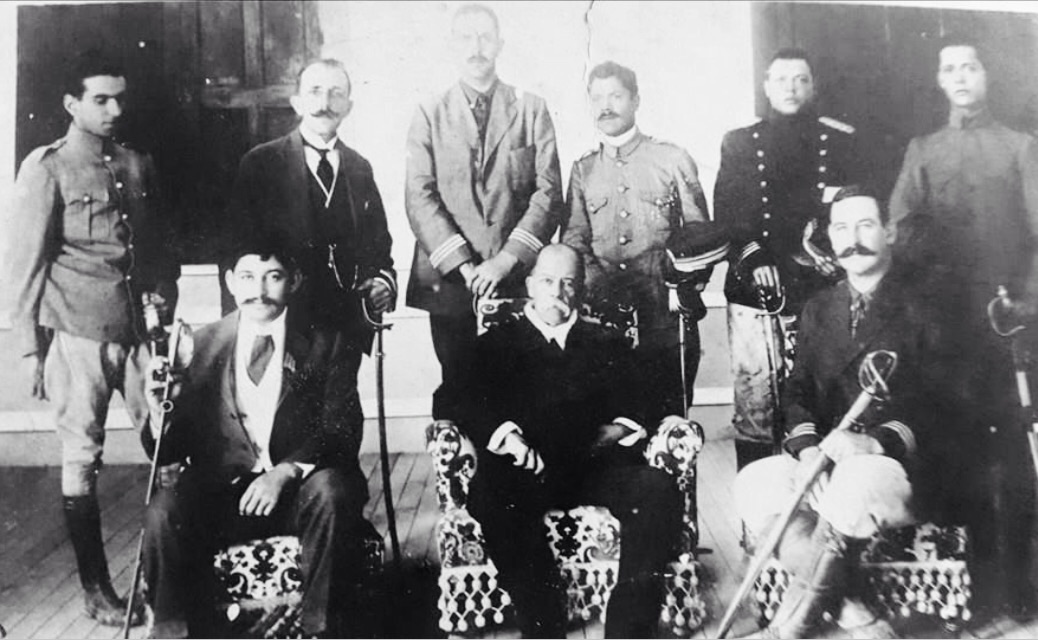
With his Army Staff the day after his resignation.

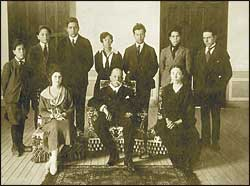
With family and children after his resignation.

== See also ==
- Carlos Herrera
- Manuel Estrada Cabrera
- United Fruit Company

== Notes and references ==
=== Bibliography ===
- Arévalo Martínez, Rafael (1945). ¡Ecce Pericles! (in Spanish). Guatemala: Tipografía Nacional.
- Bianchi Smout, Julio (1941). Prólogo de "¡Ecce Pericles!" de Rafael Arévalo Martínez (in Spanish). Guatemala: Tipografía Nacional.
- Bucheli, Marcelo; Jones, Geoffrey G. (May 27, 2005). "The Octopus and the Generals: the United Fruit Company in Guatemala". Harvard Business Review.
- Bucheli, Marcelo (2006). "The United Fruit Company in Latin America: Business Strategies in a Changing Environment". In Jones, Geoffrey; Wadhwani, Daniel (eds.). Entrepreneurship and Global Capitalism. Vol. 2. Cheltenham (UK): Edward Elgar. pp. 342–383.
- Buchenau, J. (1996). In the Shadow of the Giant, the Making of Mexico's Central America Policy (1876-1930). Univ of Alabama Pr; edition: Vintage Intl. ISBN 0-8173-0829-6.
- De los Ríos, Efraín (1948). Ombres contra Hombres (in Spanish). Fondo para Cultura de la Universidad de México, México.
- Hernández de León, Federico (1930). El libro de las efemérides: capítulos de la historia de América Central (in Spanish). Vol. 3. Sánchez y de Guise.
- Montenegro, Gustavo Adolfo (2005). "Yo, el Supremo". Revista Domigo de Prensa Libre (in Spanish). Archived from the original on 6 October 2014.
- Ortiz Rivas, Silverio (1922). Reseña histórica de la parte que el elemento obrero tuvo en el Partido Unionista (in Spanish). Guatemala: unpublished. "Partially reproduced in ¡Ecce Pericles! by Rafael Arévalo Martínez"
- Unión Tipográfica (1920). "Principales jefes del Cabrerismo" (in Spanish). Guatemala: Unión Tipográfica.
- Vidaurre, Adrián (1921). Los últimos treinta años pasados de la vida política de Guatemala (in Spanish). La Habana, Cuba: Imprenta Sainz, Arca y Cía.
- Prins Wilhelm (1922). Between two continents, notes from a journey in Central America, 1920. London, UK: E. Nash and Grayson, Ltd. pp. 148–209.
