= Harpsund =

Manor house in Södermanland County, Sweden

Coordinates: 59°06′N 16°29′E

- Harpsund
- Interactive map of the Harpsund area

General information
- Type: Manor house, official residence
- Location: Flen Municipality, Södermanland County, Sweden
- Current tenants: Prime Minister of Sweden
- Completed: 1914
- Owner: Government of Sweden

Technical details
- Floor area: 1,650 hectares

Design and construction
- Architect: Otar Hökerberg

Website
- harpsund.se

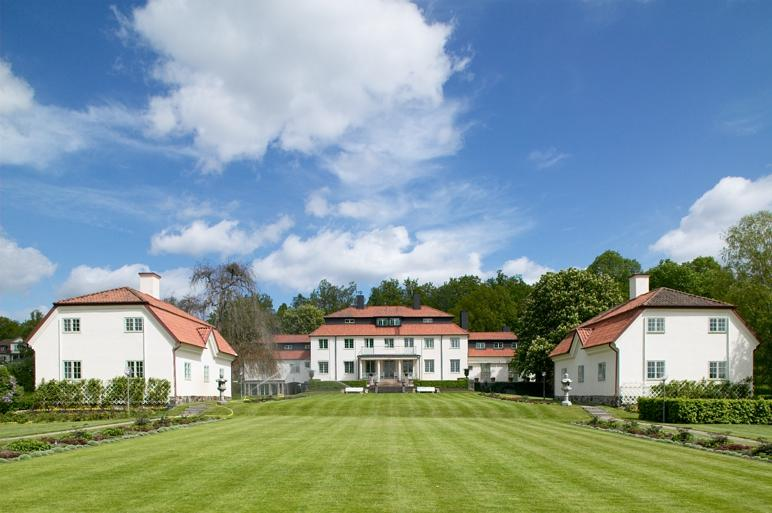
The main building of Harpsund.

Harpsund is a manor house located in Flen Municipality, Södermanland County, Sweden.

Since 22 May 1953, Harpsund has been used as a country retreat for the prime minister of Sweden.

== History ==
The earliest known mention of Harpsund dates from 1380 when seneschal Bo Jonsson (Grip) acquired property at Harpsund by swapping land with Joon Skräddare. Axel Stålarm, president of Göta Court of Appeal and county governor, changed its name to Axelsberg when he inherited the property in 1647. He also moved the buildings on the property to their current location on the northern, more sheltered side of Harpsund Bay. The oldest parts of the current mansion are from the 17th century and the Stålarm era. The Sparre family took over in 1784 and continued to own Axelsberg until 1899 when a member of the Wicander family bought it together with a business partner. Industrialist Hjalmar Wicander later bought the property from his cousin's widow and took back its old name Harpsund. At this time, the buildings were in a bad condition and the existing main building had to be torn town and rebuilt. The new main building was designed by Otar Hökerberg and was completed in 1914.

When Hjalmar Wicander died in 1939, Harpsund was inherited by his son Carl August Wicander, who died 27 December 1952 and in his will donated the estate to the State to be used as retreat and recreational estate for the prime minister. The donation included the entire estate, including farmland and forestry. He also wished to have Harpsund preserved the way it looked when the Wicander family lived there. The donation was approved by the Riksdag on 22 May 1953. The estate consists of 1,650 hectares (16.5 km^{2}). Some adjustments were made in the conditions of the donation, which states that, with the exception of the main building, the estate could be made available to governmental conferences. Harpsund would soon be a venue for informal summits between the Government, industry and labour organizations called Harpsund Democracy (Swedish: Harpsundsdemokrati). Through the years many foreign leaders have stayed there as guests. Especially noticed was the visit by Nikita Khrushchev, leader of the Soviet Union. It is tradition that guests at the estate take a small trip, with the prime minister, in the rowing boat (Harpsundsekan), a tradition introduced by Prime Minister Tage Erlander.

== Gallery ==
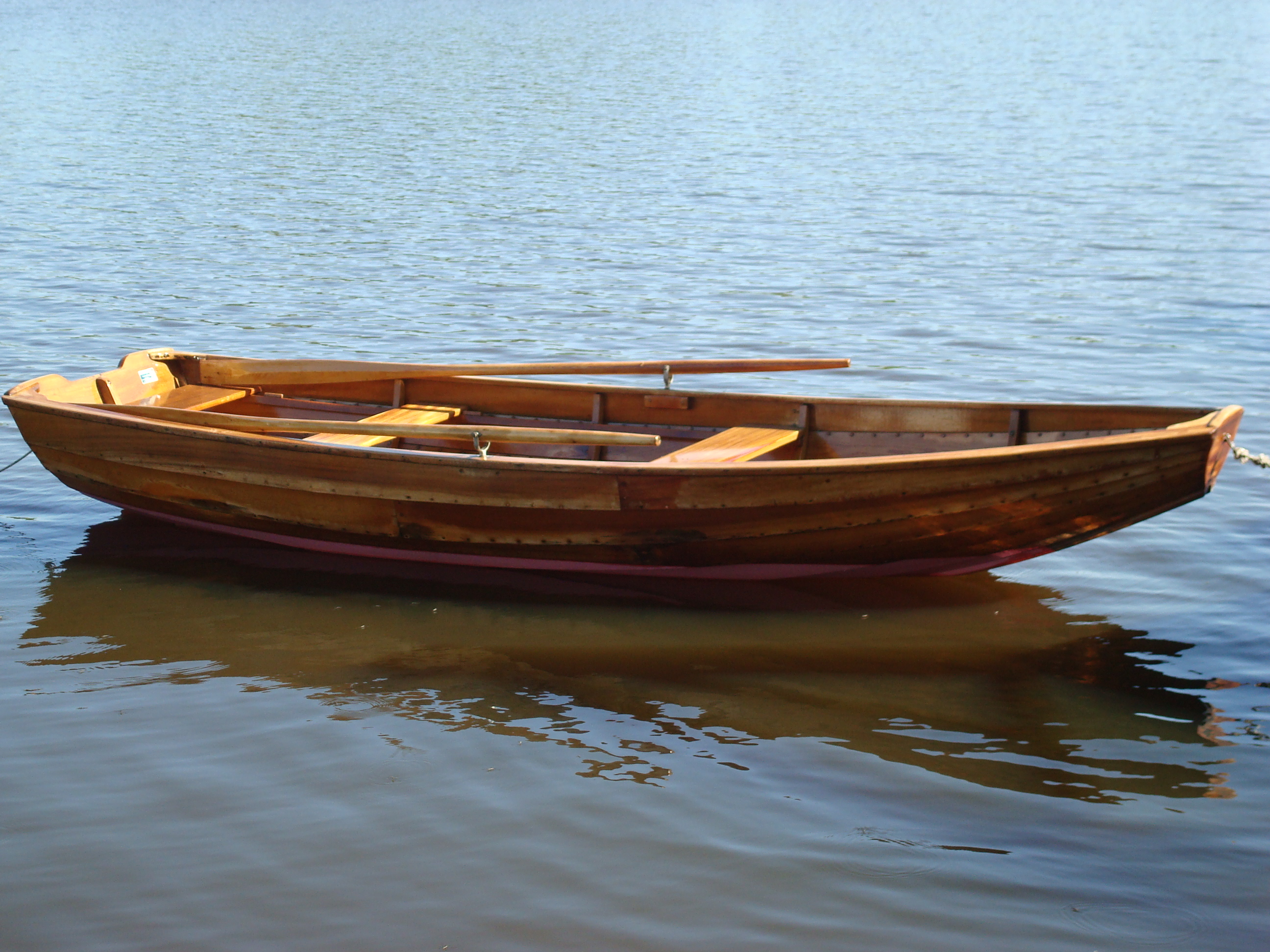
The rowing boat of Harpsund

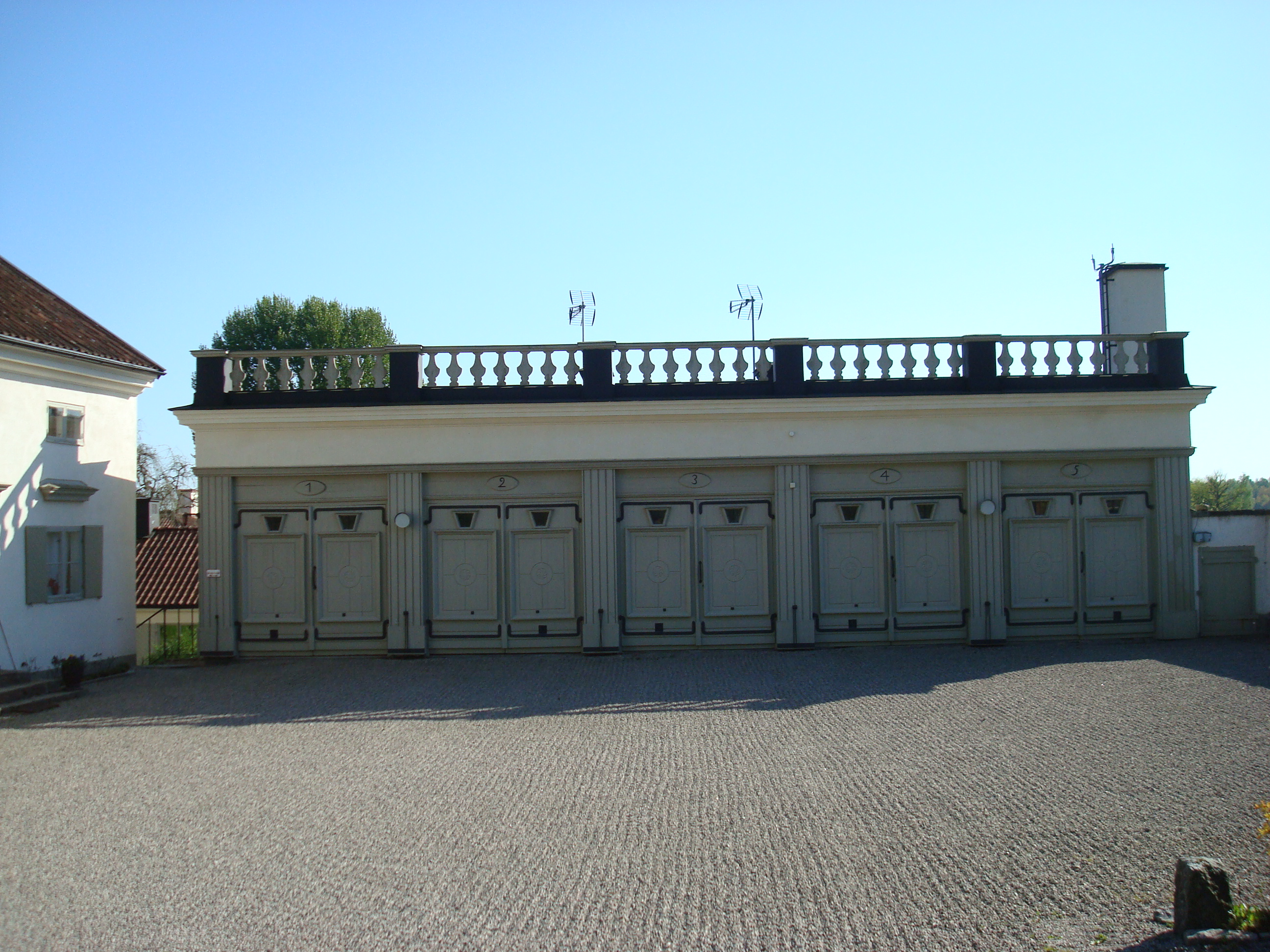
The garage

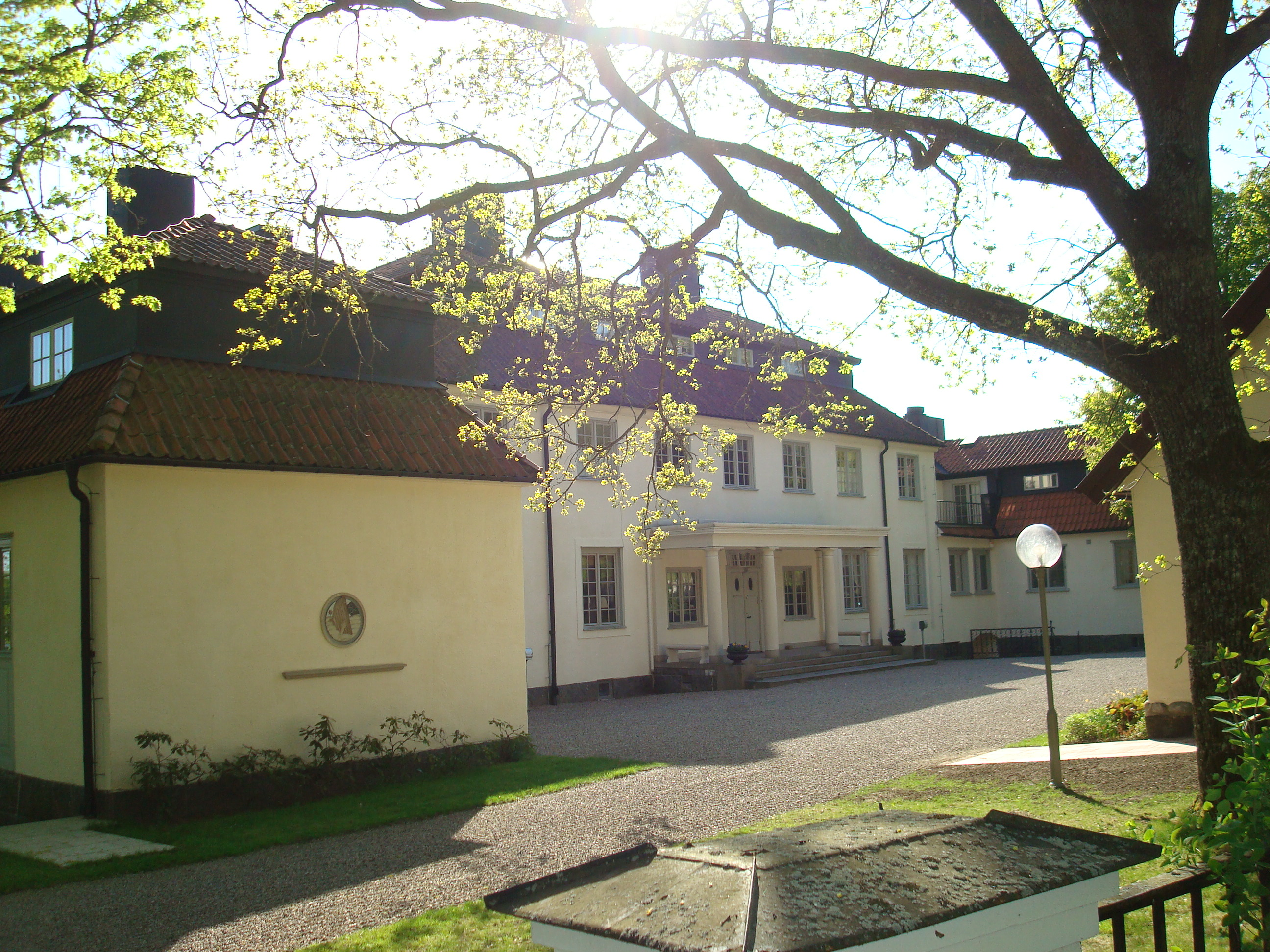
The main building

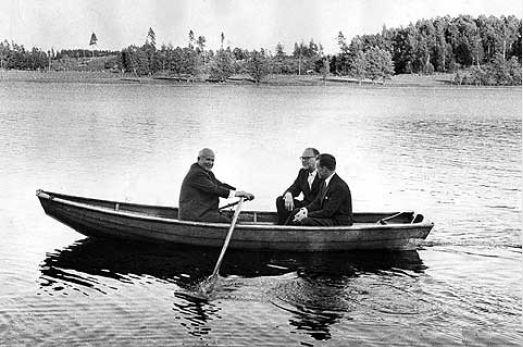
Nikita Khrushchev, Tage Erlander and a translator in the rowing boat in 1964.

== See also ==
- Crown palaces in Sweden
- Stenhammar Palace

=== Analogous facilities ===
- Camp David, country residence of the president of the United States
- Chequers, country residence of the prime minister of the United Kingdom
- Harrington Lake, country residence of the prime minister of Canada
- Kultaranta, summer residence of the president of Finland
- The Mansion, summer residence of the president of the Philippines
- Palace of Cerro Castillo, summer residence of the president of Chile in Viña del Mar
