= Swedish governmental line of succession =

Succession upon death of the Swedish Prime Minister

The Swedish constitution of 1974 allows the prime minister of Sweden to appoint one of the ministers in the cabinet as deputy prime minister (ställföreträdande statsminister, also unofficially known as vice statsminister, "Vice Prime Minister"), in case the prime minister for some reason is prevented from performing his or her duties. However, if a deputy prime minister has not been appointed, the minister in the cabinet who has served the longest time (and if there are several with equal experience the one who is oldest) takes over as head of government. Note that the person acting as prime minister does not do so on a permanent basis: if a prime minister dies, resigns or loses a vote of confidence in the Riksdag, the Speaker of the Riksdag will then confer with the parties of the Riksdag and propose a new prime minister, who must be tolerated by a majority of the Riksdag. A prime minister who has resigned or lost a vote of confidence will remain the head of a government ad interim until the new prime minister assumes office. The only case where the governmental line of succession becomes relevant is when the prime minister dies (upon which the person next in the line of succession serves as the head of a government ad interim) or when the prime minister is on leave or for any other reason incapable of serving, but still remains in office. This might be compared to the presidential line of succession in the United States, where the person next in line assumes the presidency throughout the remainder of the term if the president dies, resigns or is impeached.
