= Prince Wilhelm, Duke of Södermanland =

Swedish prince (1884–1965)

Prince Wilhelm
- Duke of Södermanland
- The Duke of Södermanland in 1911
- Born: 17 June 1884; Tullgarn Palace, Trosa, Sweden
- Died: 5 June 1965 (aged 80); Stenhammar Palace, Sweden
- Spouse: Grand Duchess Maria Pavlovna of Russia (m. 1908; div. 1914)
- Issue: Lennart Bernadotte
Names
- Carl Wilhelm Ludvig
- House: Bernadotte
- Father: Gustaf V of Sweden
- Mother: Victoria of Baden

Prince Wilhelm of Sweden, Duke of Södermanland (Carl Wilhelm Ludvig; 17 June 1884 – 5 June 1965) was a Swedish and Norwegian prince. He authored many books (primarily in Swedish) as Prins Wilhelm.

== Personal life ==
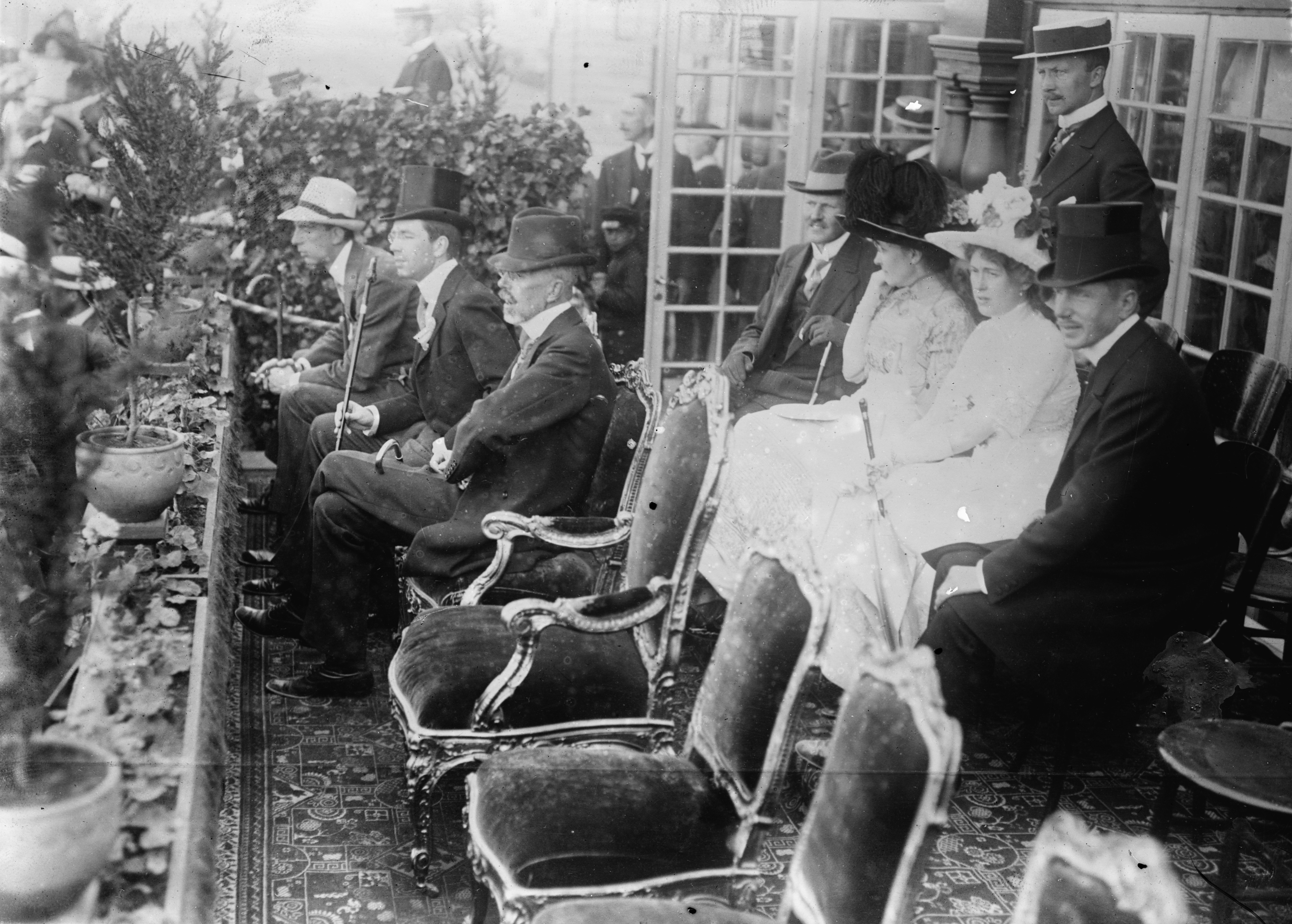
Prince Wilhelm with his elder brother and father King Gustaf V at the 1912 Summer Olympics

Wilhelm was born at Tullgarn Palace, the second son of King Gustaf V of Sweden and his wife Victoria of Baden.

=== Marriage and divorce ===
On 3 May 1908, in Tsarskoye Selo, Wilhelm married his third cousin Grand Duchess Maria Pavlovna of Russia, a daughter of Grand Duke Paul Alexandrovich of Russia by his first wife Princess Alexandra of Greece and Denmark. The bride was a cousin of the reigning Russian tsar, Nicholas II. The couple had one son: Lennart (1909–2004).

The marriage was unhappy. Their son, Lennart, later wrote an autobiography in which he revealed several details of the Swedish royal family. The autobiography tells of how Maria, like her aunt and namesake Grand Duchess Maria Alexandrovna, Duchess of Saxe-Coburg and Gotha, felt that she had married beneath herself in marrying a younger son of the King of Sweden, and this caused problems of ego between the couple. Maria insisted that the servants address her by her correct style Your Imperial and Royal Highness, to the chagrin of her husband, who was merely a Royal Highness. When apprised of the matter, Wilhelm's father King Gustav V had no choice but to acquiesce with his daughter-in-law's wish, which was perfectly valid in law, and ordered that the imperial style be used invariably for Maria.

Maria sought a divorce because of what she described as the horror she then felt toward the Swedish royal family, due to their unlimited support of their official physician, Axel Munthe, who had accosted her sexually. The divorce was granted in 1914, and Maria returned to Russia.

=== Later life ===
Wilhelm had a relationship, which was not publicly known, with Jeanne de Tramcourt which lasted from around 1914 (starting date unknown) until Jeanne's death in 1952. They lived together for more than 30 years on the estate Stenhammar near Flen. This was at a time when cohabitation was very unusual and not officially allowed to occur among royalty. Jeanne de Tramcourt was therefore called his "hostess" at Stenhammar. On 2 January 1952 she died in a car accident in a snowstorm near Stjärnhov in Södermanland, when they were on their way to Stenhammar after visiting Wilhelm's son Lennart. Wilhelm was driving when the accident took place. After this tragedy, he is said never to have recovered.

=== Career and interests ===
Wilhelm was a noted photographer and the author of several books written in Swedish under the pen name Prins Wilhelm. He was in Guatemala during the Tragic Week of 1920 and wrote the book Between Two Continents about his experiences.

In keeping with protocol demanded of royalty in modern democracies, Wilhelm kept studiously away from politics. One of his rare forays into the political sphere happened during the Second World War, following the murder of the Danish playwright and Lutheran pastor Kaj Munk on 4 January 1944. It was alleged, perhaps correctly, that the occupying German forces (specifically the Gestapo) were behind the murder, and the Danish resistance newspaper De frie Danske carried condemnatory reactions from numerous influential Scandinavians. Wilhelm was one of those who condemned the murder.

=== Death ===
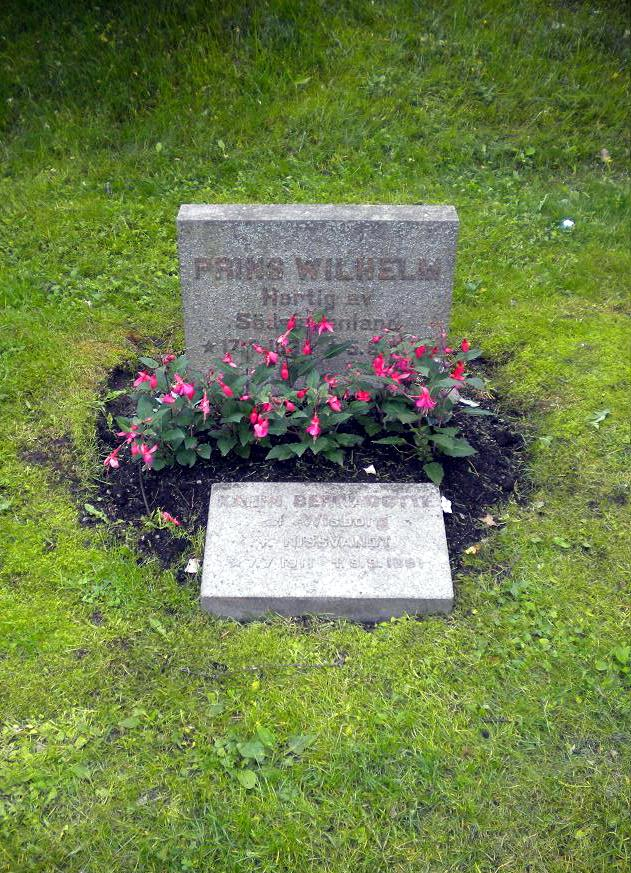
The simple grave of Prince Wilhelm and his first daughter-in-law Karin (Nissvandt) Bernadotte in Flen

Wilhelm suffered from emphysema caused by several years of chain smoking and died in his sleep, from a heart attack, in Flen, just 12 days before his 81st birthday.

== Honours and awards ==
He received the following orders and decorations:

=== National honours ===
- Knight and Commander of the Seraphim, 17 June 1884
- Knight of the Order of Charles XIII, 17 June 1884
- Commander Grand Cross of the Sword, 17 June 1884
- Commander Grand Cross of the Polar Star, 17 June 1884
- Commander Grand Cross of the Order of Vasa, 16 June 1948
- King Oscar II and Queen Sofia's Golden Wedding Medal
- King Oscar II's Jubilee Commemorative Medal
- Crown Prince Gustaf V and Crown Princess Silver Wedding Medal
- King Gustaf V's Jubilee Commemorative Medal (1928)
- King Gustaf V's Jubilee Commemorative Medal (1948)

=== Foreign honours ===
- Norway:
  - Grand Cross of St. Olav, with Collar, 17 June 1884
  - Knight of the Norwegian Lion, 21 January 1904
  - King Haakon VII Freedom Cross
- Belgium: Grand Cordon of the Order of Leopold
- Denmark:
  - Knight of the Elephant, 18 December 1907
  - King Christian X's Liberty Medal
- Egyptian Royal Family: Collar of the Order of Muhammad Ali
- Ethiopian Imperial Family: Collar of the Order of Solomon
- Finland: Grand Cross of the White Rose
- French Third Republic: Grand Cross of the Legion of Honour
- Italian Royal Family: Knight of the Annunciation, 5 July 1913
- Monaco: Grand Cross of St. Charles, 14 April 1927
- Netherlands: Grand Cross of the Netherlands Lion, 6 July 1901
- Romanian Royal Family: Grand Cross of the Order of Carol I
- Thailand: Knight of the Order of the Royal House of Chakri
- Turkish Imperial Family:
  - Order of Osmanieh, 1st Class
  - Gold Imtiyaz Medal
- Tunisian Royal Family: Order of the Fundamental Pact
- United Kingdom of Great Britain and Ireland:
  - Honorary Knight Grand Cross of the Royal Victorian Order, 15 June 1905
  - King George V Coronation Medal
- German Imperial and Royal Family:
  - Knight of the Black Eagle
  - Grand Cross of the Red Eagle
  - Kaiser Wilhelm Memorial Medal
  - Baden Grand Ducal Family:
    - Knight of the House Order of Fidelity, 1902
    - Jubilee Medal for 1902
    - Commemorative Medal for the Golden Jubilee of Grand Duke Friedrich I and Grand Duchess Luise
- Russian Imperial Family:
  - Knight of St. Andrew
  - Knight of St. Alexander Nevsky
  - Knight of the White Eagle
  - Knight of St. Anna, 1st Class
  - Knight of St. Stanislaus, 1st Class

== Titles and arms ==
=== Titles ===
- 1884-1905: His Royal Highness Prince Wilhelm of Sweden and Norway, Duke of Södermanland
- 1905-1965: His Royal Highness Prince Wilhelm of Sweden, Duke of Södermanland

=== Arms ===
Wilhelm's coat of arms as prince of Sweden and Norway, Duke of Södermanland 1884 to 1905

Wilhelm's coat of arms as prince of Sweden, Duke of Södermanland after 1907

== Ancestors ==
Ancestors of Prince Wilhelm, Duke of Södermanland

8. Oscar I of Sweden
4. Oscar II of Sweden
9. Princess Josephine of Leuchtenberg
2. Gustaf V of Sweden
10. William, Duke of Nassau
5. Princess Sophia of Nassau
11. Princess Pauline of Württemberg
1. Prince Wilhelm, Duke of Södermanland
12. Leopold, Grand Duke of Baden
6. Frederick I, Grand Duke of Baden
13. Princess Sophie of Sweden
3. Princess Victoria of Baden
14. William I, German Emperor
7. Princess Louise of Prussia
15. Princess Augusta of Saxe-Weimar-Eisenach

Prince Wilhelm, Duke of Södermanland House of Bernadotte Born: 17 June 1884 Died: 5 June 1965
Swedish royalty
Preceded by Prince Carl Oscar, Duke of Södermanland	Duke of Södermanland	Succeeded by Prince Alexander, Duke of Södermanland
