= Stenhammar Palace =

Palace in Södermanland County, Sweden

Stenhammar
- Sweden
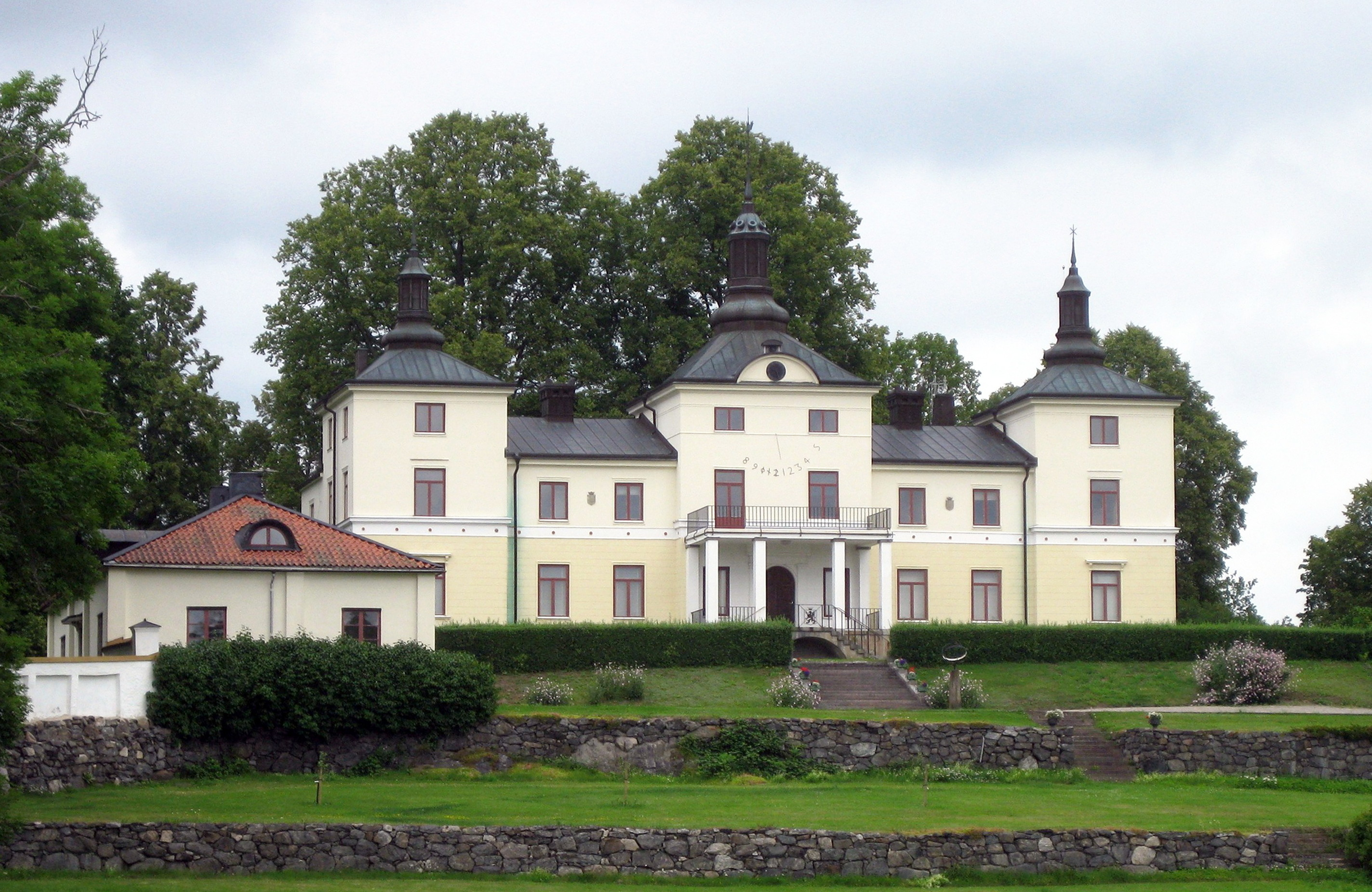

Site information
- Type: Palace; Country estate
- Owner: The State
- Controlled by: King Carl XVI Gustaf (leaseholder)

Location
- Coordinates: 59°03′02″N 16°33′07″E

Site history
- Built: 1658; 368 years ago
- Built by: Johan Johansson Rosenhane
- Materials: Dimension stone

Stenhammar is a palace and mansion located outside Flen in Södermanland County, Sweden, about 120 kilometers southwest of Stockholm. It is situated right by the Western Main Line railway (Västra stambanan).

Stenhammar is owned by the State and it has been leased to King Carl XVI Gustaf since 1966, but is not considered a crown palace. The previous leaseholder was Prince Wilhelm, Duke of Södermanland (younger brother of the King's paternal grandfather) who lived there and held it until his death. Stenhammar was donated to the state by landowner and courtier Robert von Kræmer in 1903, and the will stipulates that it should be leased out to a prince of the royal house, preferably a Duke of Södermanland, if there is one.

In August 2023 King Carl XVI Gustaf and Queen Silvia received Ukrainian president Volodymyr Zelenskyy at the palace as a part of the latter's visit to Sweden to discuss the ongoing Russian invasion of Ukraine.

== See also ==
- List of palaces in Sweden
- Harpsund
