= History of Guatemala City =

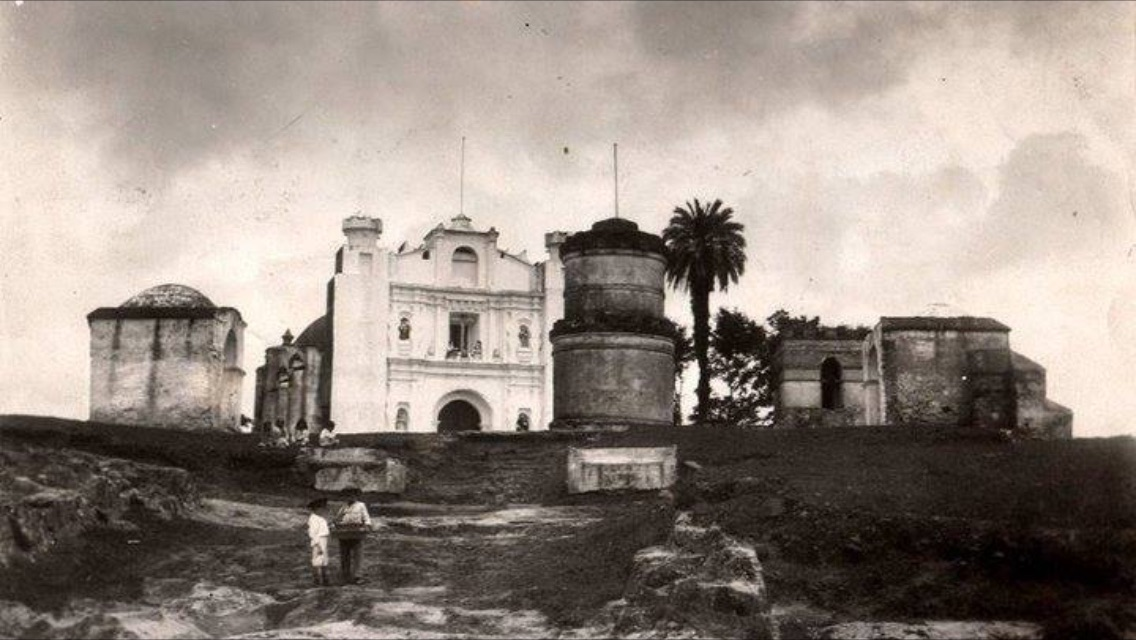
"Cerrito del Carmen" church. First construction ever built by the Spaniards in the valley that eventually became Guatemala City.

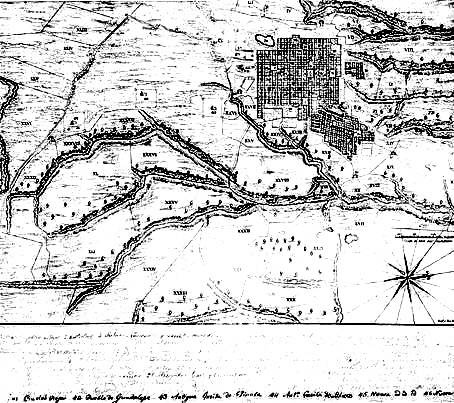
Map of Guatemala City in 1821.

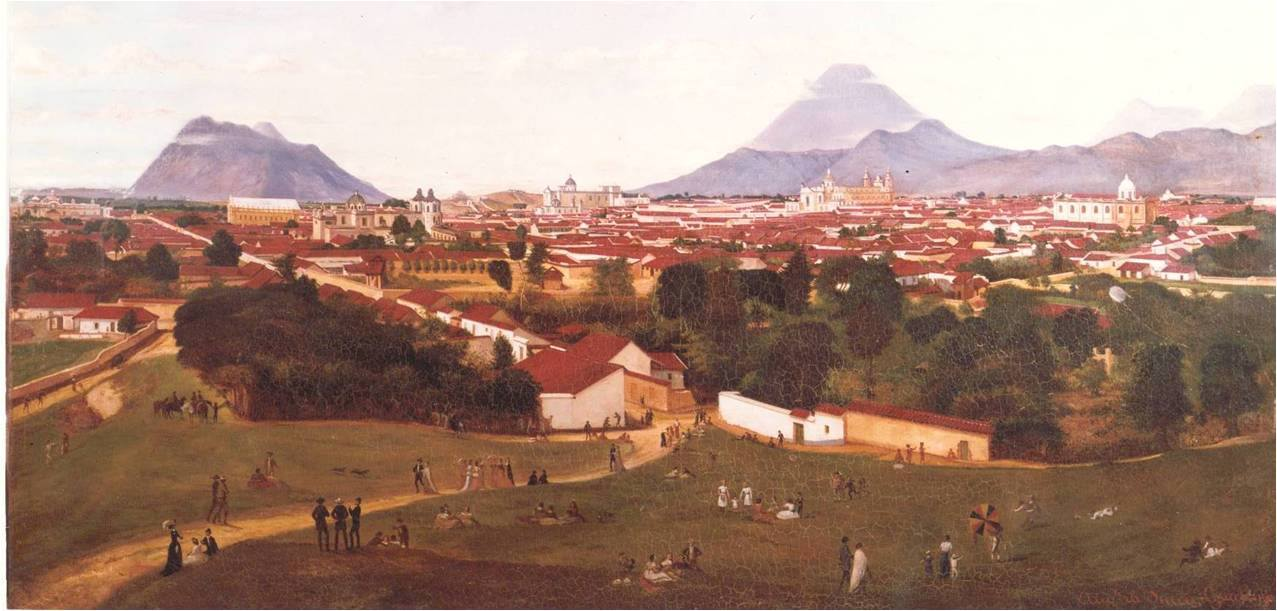
Guatemala City in the 1870s

Human settlement on the present site of Guatemala City began with the Maya who built a city at Kaminaljuyu. The Spanish colonists established a small town, which was made a capital city in 1775. At this period the Central Square with the Cathedral and Royal Palace were constructed. After Central American independence from Spain the city became the capital of the United Provinces of Central America in 1821.

The 19th century saw the construction of the monumental Carrera Theater in the 1850s, and the Presidential Palace in the 1890s. At this time the city was expanding around the 30 de junio Boulevard and elsewhere, displacing native settlements from the ancient site. Earthquakes in 1917–1918 destroyed many historic structures. Under Jorge Ubico (1878–1946, ruled 1931–1944), in the 1930s a hippodrome and many new public buildings were constructed, although peripheral poor neighborhoods that formed after the 1917–1918 earthquakes continued to lack basic amenities.

During the long-running strife of the Guatemalan Civil War, terror attacks beginning with the burning of the Spanish Embassy in 1980 led to severe destruction and loss of life in the city. In May 2010 two disasters struck: the eruption of the Pacaya volcano, and two days later Tropical Storm Agatha.

== Pre-Columbian period ==
Humans have long inhabited and settled in the areas in and around modern-day Guatemala City. Upon the advent of agriculture, some of these early Neolithic settlements grew to become large, stratified cities. Testimony of this can be seen in the western suburbs of Guatemala City, where the ruins of the central ceremonial center of the Preclassic Maya city of Kaminaljuyu are located. Archeological evidence demonstrates that Kaminaljuyu was first occupied by the Maya around 1500 BC, with the site being continuously inhabited until around 1200 AD.

The footprint of the archeological site is extensive, proof of the size and sophistication of Kaminaljuyu at its Preclassic peak. As a result, in the late 20th century, the unregulated suburbs of modern-day Guatemala City grew above and around the ruins. Many of the outlying ruins, along with several hundred temple mounds, were covered over with freeways, shopping centers, businesses, luxury hotels and residential areas. However, the central ceremonial center of Kaminaljuyu came under the protection of the Guatemalan government and is now a park.

== The Spanish colonial period ==
In Spanish colonial times, Guatemala City was a small town. It had a monastery called El Carmen, founded in 1620 (this was the second hermitage). The capital of the Spanish Captaincy General of Guatemala, covering most of modern Central America, was moved here after a series of earthquakes – the Santa Marta earthquakes that started on 29 July 1773 – destroyed the old capital, Antigua. On 27 September 1775, King Charles III of Spain officiated at the moving of the capital. This move to a location at a significant distance from the volcanoes believed to have caused the earthquake dramatically increased the potential for expansion of the city. The new city was given the name Nueva Guatemala (New Guatemala).

=== Central Square ===
Central Square was the civic and political center of Guatemala city from its foundation in 1776 until the beginning of democratic rule in 1985. Around the square were the main religious and political buildings of the country. The cathedral, on the east side, was built between 1782 and 1815, with the towers being completed in 1867. Its massive structure incorporates baroque and classical elements and has withstood numerous earthquakes. On the west side, the Royal Palace was the Executive branch headquarters for the Capitanía of Guatemala from the time the city was established in 1776 until the earthquakes of 1917 and 1918.

Guatemala City was the scene of the declaration of independence of Central America from Spain, and became the capital of the United Provinces of Central America in 1821.

Independence of Central America
15 September 1821

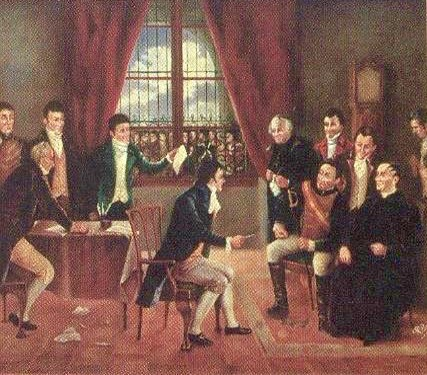
Signing of the declaration of independence of Central America inside the Royal Palace in 1821. Rafael Beltranena painting.

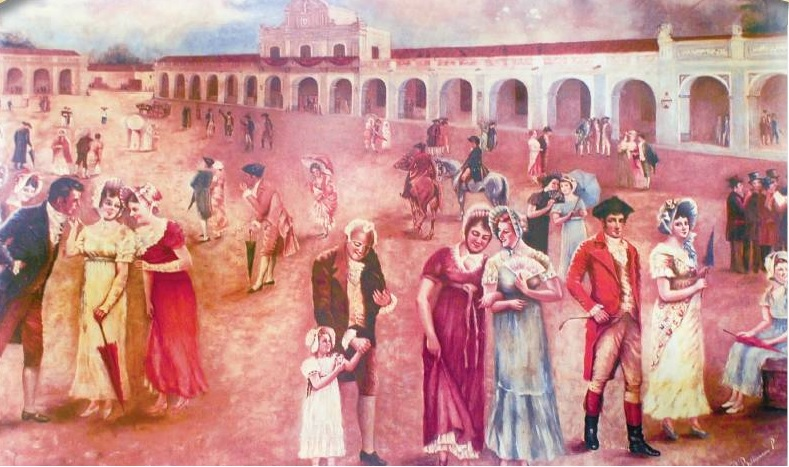
Criollos celebrating their independence from Spain outside the Royal Palace in 1821. Rafael Beltranena painting.

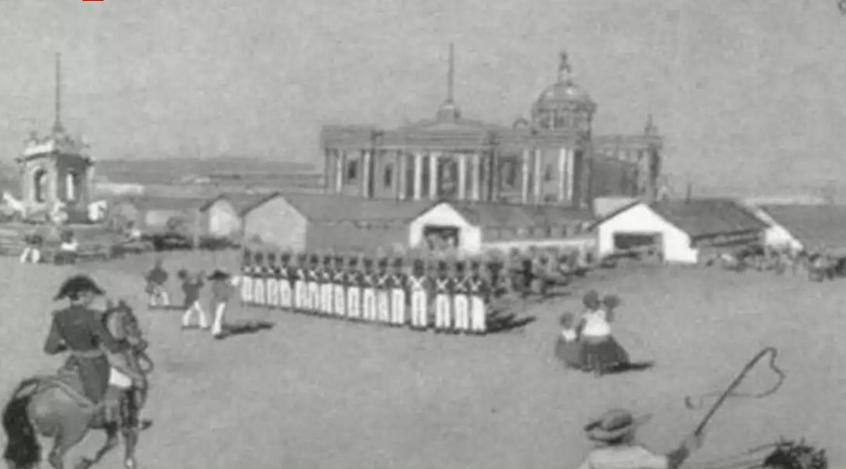
Cathedral of Guatemala City in 1850. The very first lightning rods in use in Guatemala can be seen both on the Cathedral and on the Carlos III fountain in the middle of Central Park.

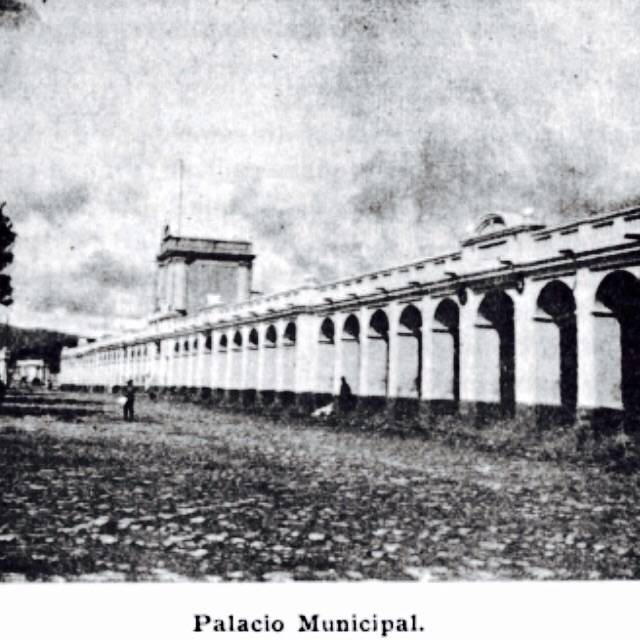
Colonial City Hall in 1907.

Para el año 1821 se tuvo noticia en el Reino de Guatemala la proclamación del Plan de Iguala en el Virreinato de Nueva España en el mes de febrero, y en el cual se declaraba la independencia del Imperio español. También Ciudad Real de Chiapas se declaró independiente en agosto. Ante estos hechos, Gabino Gaínza, que se encontraba al frente de la Capitanía General de Guatemala, se vio presionado por los criollos centroamericanos para proclamar la independencia de inmediato.

== 19th century ==
=== Carrera Theatre ===
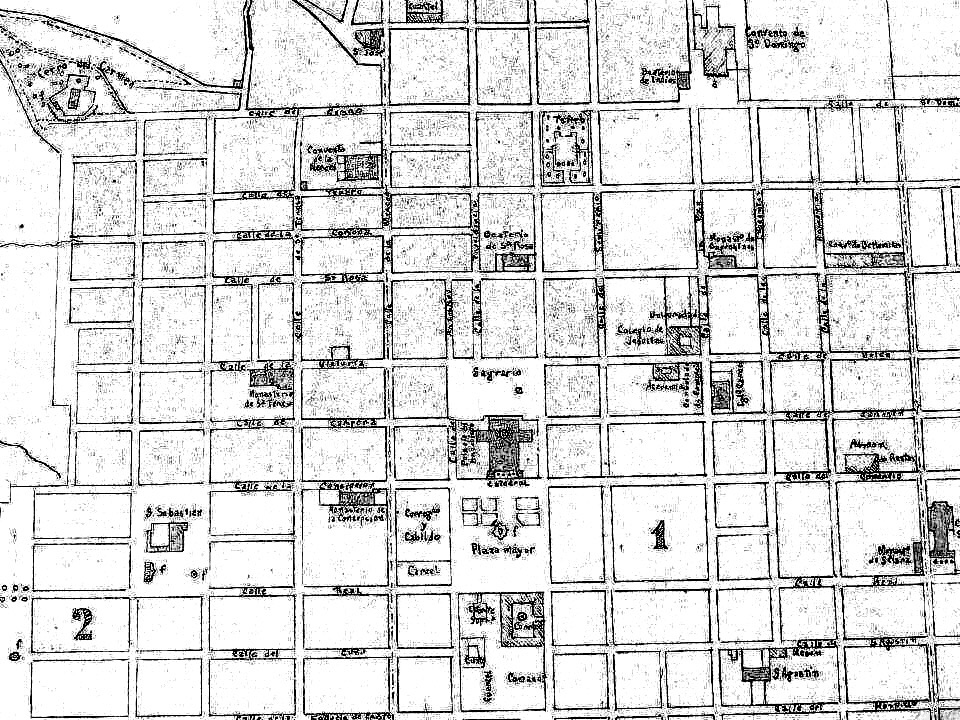
Map of the city in 1868 showing the Carrera Theater

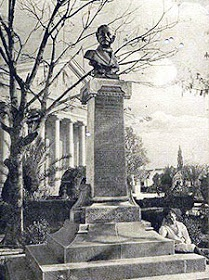
José Batres Montúfar bust, placed in the newly remodeled Colón Theatre in 1892

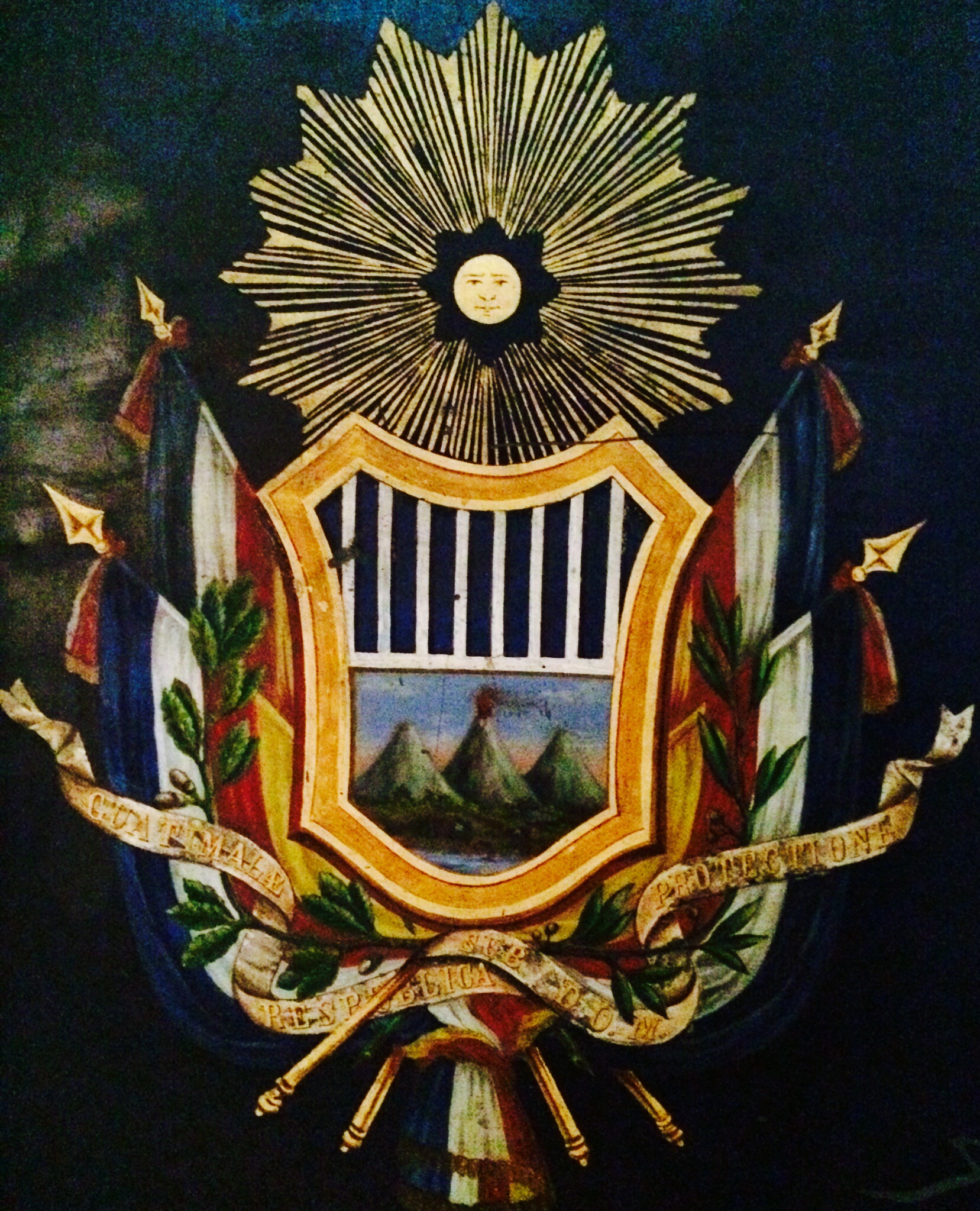
Coat of arms of the Republic of Guatemala, 1858–1871

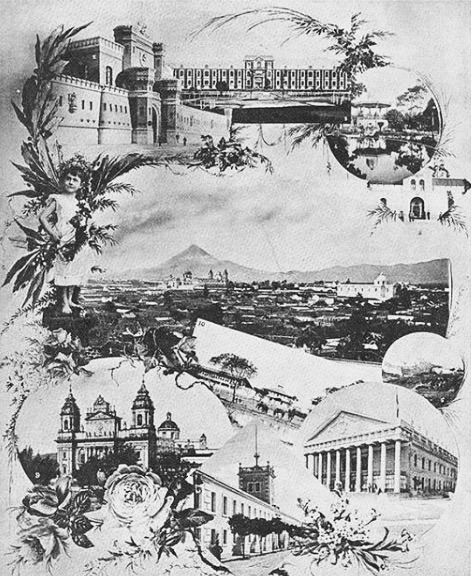
Collage of Guatemala City buildings in 1896. Most of the structures shown disappeared or were severely damaged and modified after the 1917–18 earthquakes.

An enthusiastic fan of opera, and following the advice of his mistress Josefa Silva, (Note: Ms. Silva was a professional actress and singer who had taught Rafael Carrera how to behave, write, read and sing.) president for life of Guatemala Rafael Carrera started the construction of a massive National Theater that was called "Carrera Theater" in his honor, and was located in the old Central Square. The Old Central Square was located in the northeast part of Guatemala City, then not larger than a village, and in 1776 was the site of the placement of the first block of Nueva Guatemala de la Asunción after the 1773 earthquakes destroyed Santiago de los Caballeros de Guatemala. The place was chosen as the new city Central Square, saving the surroundings for the new Cathedral, Palace, and houses for the richest family of the time, the Aycinena family, since the family leader, Fermín de Aycinena, had contributed considerably to the move of the city from its old place. However, the design approved by the Spanish crown had the Central Square in a different location, and this one became the Old Central Square.

Years later it became a commercial site, and on 6 August 1832, then State of Guatemala Governor Dr. Mariano Gálvez issued a decree to build a theater in the Old Central Square site. However, at that time the political climate was very tense in the country and when the civil war between liberal and conservative parties escalated, Galvez was overthrown and the theater was not built.

The project was revisited in 1852 when Juan Matheu and Manuel Francisco Pavón Aycinena presented Rafael Carrera with a new plan. Once approved, Carrera commissioned Matheu and Miguel Ruiz de Santisteban to build the theater. Initially, construction was to be supervised by engineer Miguel Rivera Maestre, but he quit after a few months and was replaced by German expert José Beckers, who built the Greek façades and added a lobby. This was the first monumental building ever built in the Republican era of Guatemala; it was built in the 1850s, a period when the country finally was enjoying some peace and prosperity.

Appleton's Guide to México and Guatemala of 1884 describes the theater as follows: "In the middle of the square is the Theater, similar in size and elegance to any of the rest of Spanish America. Lines of orange trees and other nice trees of brilliant flowers and delicious fragances surround the building while the statues and fountains placed at certain intervals enhance even more the beauty of the place."

After the Liberal reform of 1871, the theater was called the National Theater. In 1892, it was refurbished, removing the conservative Coat of Arms from its façade and substituting it with a sculpture and inscriptions. The orange trees, fountains and sculptures were removed, and in their place modern gardens were planted and a bust of José Batres Montúfar was erected.

During the government of General Manuel Lisandro Barillas Bercián, the theater was remodeled to celebrate the Discovery of America fourth centennial anniversary; the Italian community in Guatemala donated a statue of Christopher Columbus—Cristóbal Colón, in Spanish—which was placed next to the theater. Since then, the place has been called "Colón Theater".

=== Liberal regimes ===
General José María Reina Barrios built several monuments to embellish the Capital City. Among them are the "30 de Junio" Boulevard to celebrate the Liberal Reform of 1871 and the Presidential Palace. In 1895, Reyna Barrios hired architect José de Bustamante, who came to Guatemala from Spain to build the Presidential Palace and residence. The contract was approved on 8 February 1895. It was built in a garden that was on the southwest corner of the colonial Royal Palace on 8th Street at a cost around 4,000 Guatemalan pesos. Construction began on 1 January 1895, and it was finished on 24 December 1896.

Unfortunately, most of the infrastructure from those years was lost due to the earthquakes of 1917–1918.

Reyna Barrios Presidential Palace and residence

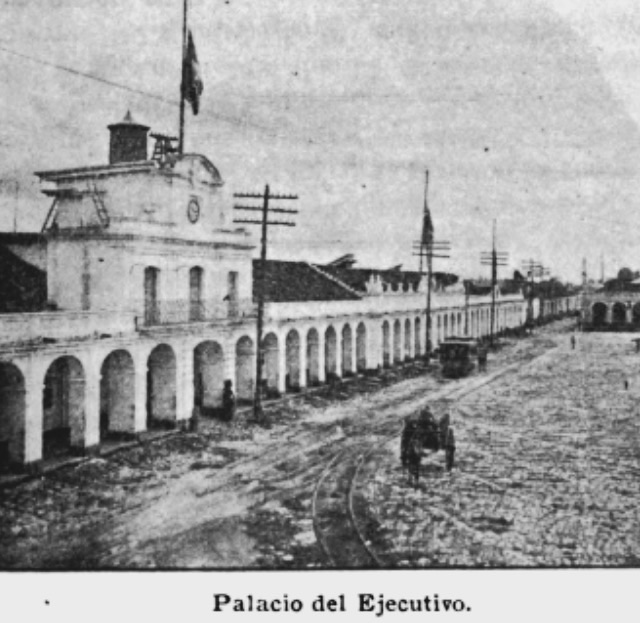
The Royal Palace in 1907.

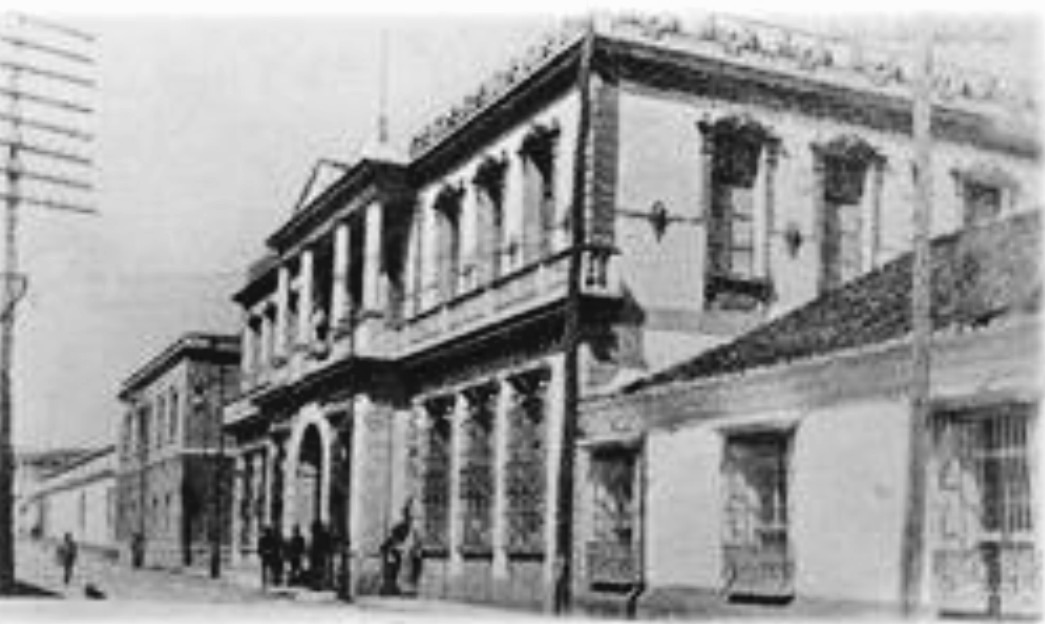
Palace exterior as seen from south to north

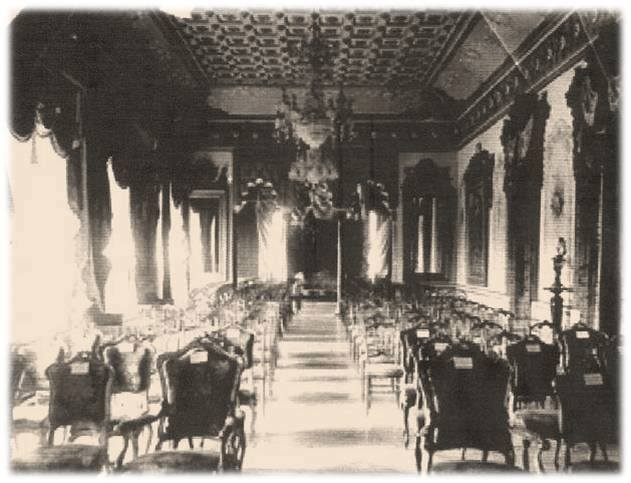
Reception Hall

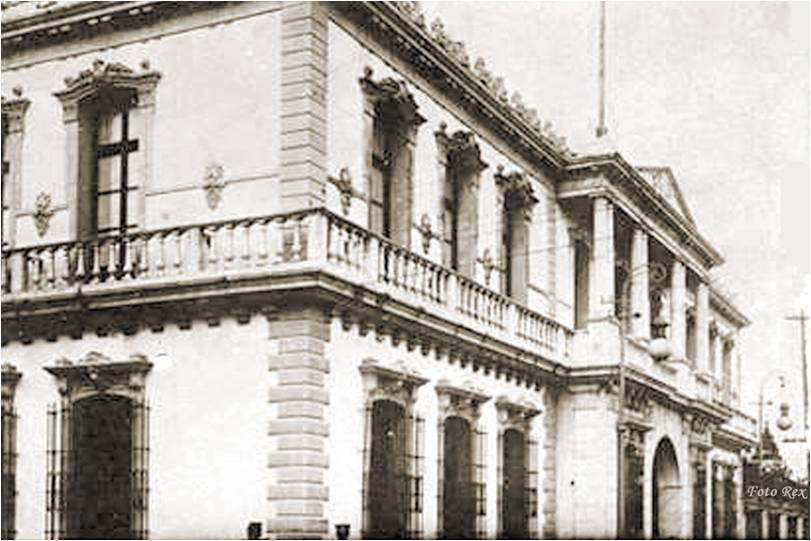
Palace exterior as seen from north to south

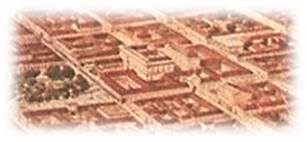
Palace location as shown in a map published in 1915

== 20th century ==
=== "30 de junio" Boulevard ===
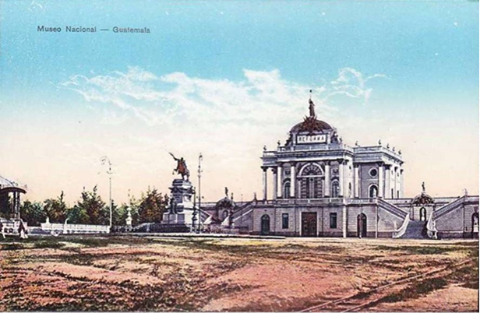
"La Reforma Palace", on the "30 de Junio" Boulevard. Built under José María Reina Barrios between 1892 and 1898 and later destroyed by the 1917–18 earthquakes

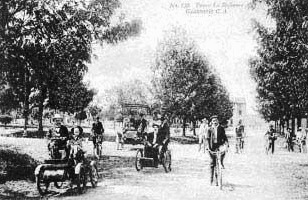
"30 de Junio" Boulevard in 1910

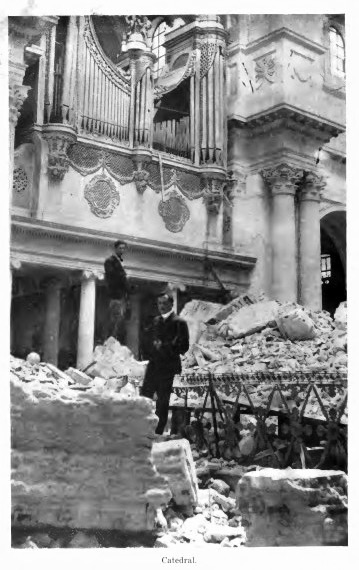
Remains of the Cathedral after the earthquake

Conservative elite members from the time of Rafael Carrera and the new coffee elite that was formed during the presidency of Justo Rufino Barrios moved their homes to the area around "30 de junio" Boulevard, on the south side of the city; also, certain native settlements were forcibly moved from Santiago de los Caballeros de Guatemala and relocated on the southeast section of the city, forming the "San Pedrito", "Ciudad Vieja" and "Villa de Guadalupe" neighborhoods. Guatemala City also expanded a little bit to the north, especially along "Simeón Cañas" Avenue, at the end of which was the Temple of Minerva, where president Manuel Estrada Cabrera celebrated the student parades in honor of the Greek goddess Minerva, and the Guatemala Relief Map was built in 1905. President Estrada Cabrera moved his residence to "La Palma", located where in 1955 the "Teodoro Palacios Flores" national gym had been built. Toward the end of Estrada Cabrera presidency in 1920, the population of Guatemala City was around 120,000.

=== 1917–1918 earthquakes ===
During the government of Manuel Estrada Cabrera – 1898–1920 – several important government buildings were constructed along 30 de Junio Boulevard, such as the Joaquina maternity home. (Note: Named after Joaquina Cabrera, the late President's mother.)

The earthquakes marked the beginning of the end for Estrada Cabrera's long regime. From 17 November 1917 to 24 January 1918, a series of quakes destroyed a number of public and religious structures and private dwellings, both in Guatemala City and Antigua Guatemala. Among the destroyed public buildings were the Palace of La Reforma built by Reyna Barrios and the Joaquina maternity home; because of this, the historical infrastructure that existed during this time has been forgotten by new generations of Guatemalans.

Temples in ruins

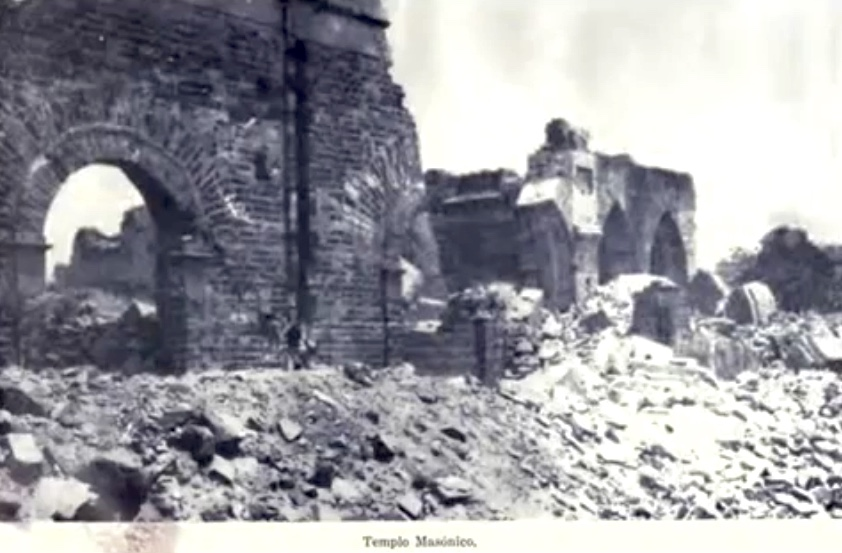
Masonic Temple of Guatemala

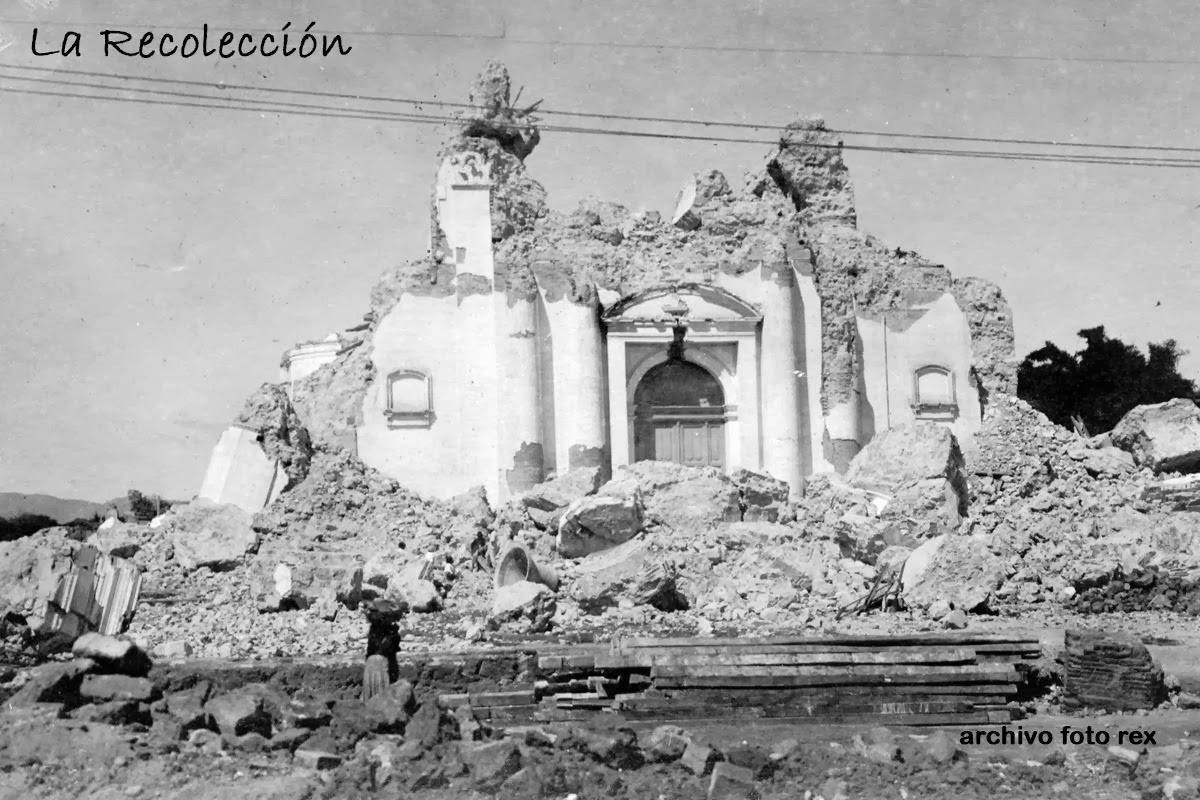
La Recolección

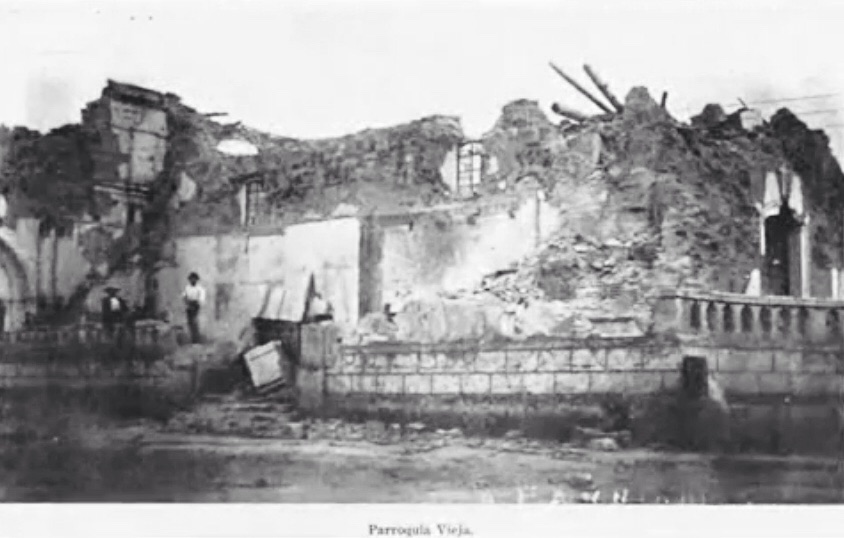
Parroquia Vieja Church

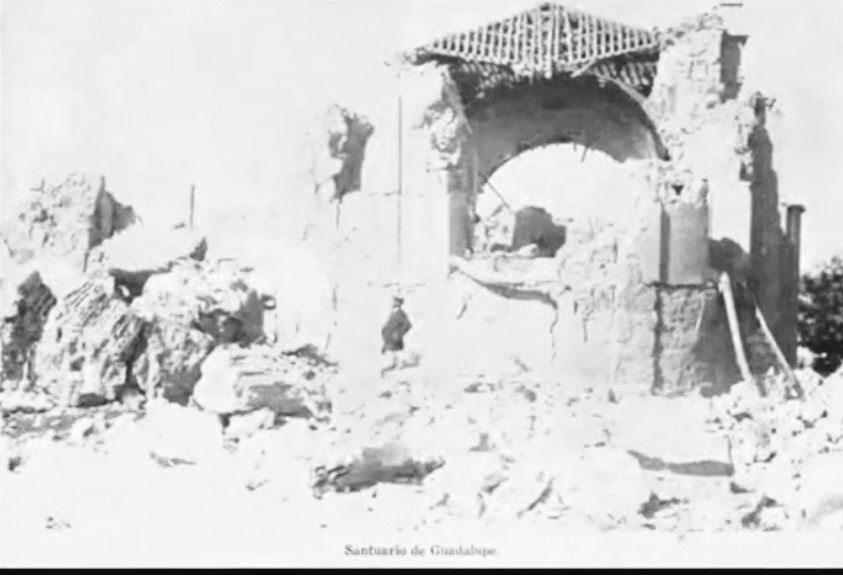
Santurario de Guadalupe Church

=== Jorge Ubico regime ===
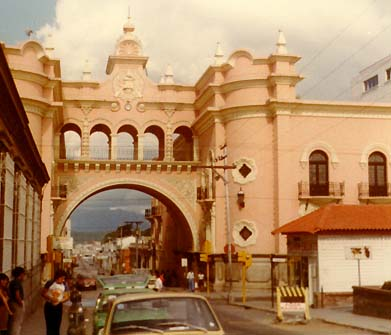
Post Office Headquarters, Guatemala (1979).

The Hipódromo del Sur (English: "Southern Horse Track") was officially inaugurated in 1923 by then president general José María Orellana, and it was a very popular recreation place in "La Aurora" National Park. the track was 1,600 metres (5,200 feet) long and 30 metres (98 feet) wide and the bleachers could seat 1500 spectators. Back in those days one could enjoy horse manoeuvers, rodeos and horse races. In 1926, president general Lázaro Chacón ordered to build new facilities and improve the horse track to increase event diversity, fairs and other shows, keeping the site under constant improvement and expansion.

In the early days of general Jorge Ubico's term in office (1931–1934) new facilities were completed; a presidential suite, and field referee quarters were added. In 1935 an outdoor concert hall was added near the track and a yearly international fair was established. For this fair, the government rented mechanical attractions such as roller coasters and there were cultural and social events; the fair was in honor of general Ubico's birthday on 10 November.

During the next years of Ubico's regime, the city expanded towards the South, with the construction of "La Aurora" International Airport and exposition halls for the "November Fair". Seventh Avenue was extended and the "Torre del Reformador" and the "Charles the Fifth fountain" were moved from the Main Square to the "Spain Plazuela". Ubico also built several palaces: National Palace, Police headquarters, Post Office headquarters, Central Custom office, and the Supreme Court. The elite homes were placed along "Avenida Reforma" (Reform Avenue), and were built of wood, American style, to resist earthquakes; much open space was retained in that area, which contributed to the peace and quiet of the zone.

In those days, Ubico designated the city mayor who was in charge of modernizing the utilities of downtown and the south area, since the elite had started to relocate there; besides, the palace buildings took 35% of the cement production of the country. On the other hand, peripheral poor neighborhoods that formed after the 1917–18 earthquakes lacked attention; these neighborhoods were "La Parroquia", "Ermita", "Candelaria", "La Reformita", "El Gallito", "Gerona" and "Palmita", among others. The population in these areas was formed by extremely poor families who lived in precarious conditions. (Note: 75% of the houses were made out of wood, and 67% of them had no floor; 97.8% had deficient zinc roofing while 90.6% had no running water, 21.5% lacked a sanitary system and 71.1% lacked any kind of underground sewerage.)

=== Civil war in the city ===
On 31 October 1965, Mario Méndez Montenegro—presidential candidate and the former first elected mayor of Guatemala City—was assassinated, shot to death. In his place in the party, Julio César Méndez Montenegro became the candidate and was elected president, after signing a pact with the Guatemalan Army, leading to a repressive regime.

Some observers referred to the policy of the Guatemalan government as "White Terror" -a term previously used to describe similar periods of anti-communist mass killing in countries such as Taiwan and Spain- Observers estimate that as many as 15,000 Guatemalans were killed by the military and government-led death squads in three years of Mendez's presidency to eliminate fewer than 300 Marxist guerrillas. Amnesty International cited lower estimates of 3,000 to 8,000 peasants killed by the military during that time. Colonel Arana, who commanded the Guatemalan army, earned the nickname "Butcher of Zacapa" or "Jackal of the East." The victims included guerrilla sympathizers, labor union leaders, intellectuals, students, and people vaguely defined "enemies of the government."

On 31 January 1980, Guatemala got worldwide attention when the Spanish Embassy in Guatemala City was burnt down, resulting in 37 deaths, including embassy personnel and high ranked Guatemalan former government officials. A group of native people from El Quiché occupied the embassy in a desperate attempt to bring attention to the issues they were having with the Army in that region of the country, which was rich in oil and had been recently populated as part of the "Franja Transversal del Norte" agricultural program. In the end, thirty seven people died after a fire started within the embassy after the police force tried to occupy the building; after that, Spain broke its diplomatic relationships with Guatemala.

On 5 September 1980 a terror attack by Ejército Guerrillero de los Pobres (EGP) took place right in front of the Guatemalan National Palace, the headquarters of the Guatemalan government at the time. The intention was to prevent the Guatemalan people from supporting a huge demonstration that the government of general Lucas Garcia had prepared for on Sunday 7 September 1980. In the attack, six adults and a little boy died after two bombs inside a vehicle went off.

There was an undetermined number of wounded and heavy material losses, not only from art pieces from the National Palace, but from all the surrounding buildings, particularly in the Lucky Building, which was right across the Presidential Office. (Note: Among the deceased was Domingo Sánchez, Secretary of Agriculture drive; Joaquín Díaz y Díaz, car washer; and Amilcar de Paz, security guard.)

"Beheaded corpses hanging from their legs in between what is left from blown up cars, shapeless bodies among glass shards and tree branches all over the place is what a terrorist attack caused yesterday at 9:35 am. El Gráfico reporters were able to get to exact place where the bomb went off, only seconds after the horrific explosion, and found a truly infernal scene in the corner of the 6th avenue and 6th street -where the Presidential Office is located- which had turned into a huge oven -but the solid building where the president worked was safe-. The reporters witnessed the dramatic rescue of the wounded, some of them critical, like the man that completely lost a leg and had only stripes of skin instead."

— El Gráfico, 6 September 1980

The attacks against private financial, commercial, and agricultural targets increased in the Lucas Garcia years, as the leftist Marxist groups saw those institutions as "reactionaries" and "millionaire exploiters" that were collaborating with the "genocidal government". The following is a non-exhaustive list of the terrorist attacks that occurred in Guatemala city and are presented in the UN Commission report:

Date	Perpetrator	Target	Result
15 September 1981	Rebel Army Forces	Corporación Financiera Nacional (CORFINA)	Car bomb damaged the building and neighbor Guatemalan and international financial institutions; there were more than Q300k in losses.
19 October 1981	EGP Urban guerilla	Industrial Bank Financial Center	Building sabotage.
21 December 1981	EGP "Otto René Castillo" commando	Bombs against newly built structures: Chamber of Industry, Torre Panamericana (Bank of Coffee headquarters) and Industrial Bank Financial Center	Car bombs completely destroyed the buildings windows.
28 December 1981	EGP "Otto René Castillo" commando	Industrial Bank Financial Center	Car bomb against the building which virtually destroyed one of the bank towers. In a sign of defiance, the bank did not repair the windows immediately and continued operating as normally as it could.

=== Overpass constructions ===
Guatemala City started growing uncontrollably after the 1976 earthquake, which led to serious transit problems, especially at rush hour. To help with this situation, City Hall started building overpasses; the first during this modernization period was the Tecún Umán overpass, that connects zones 8, 9 and 13. The structure has four concrete bridges and a freeway exchange transit system. The overpass was built in three phases, beginning in October 1991 and completing on 31 August 1993.

== 21st century ==
=== Pacaya volcano eruption of 2010 ===
Four volcanoes are visible from Guatemala City, and two of them are active. The closest and most active is Pacaya, which often expels large amounts of ash and rocks, the others are Volcán de Fuego, Acatenango and Volcán de Agua. On the night of 27 May 2010, Pacaya volcano erupted; the ash column reached 1,500 metres (4,900 feet) above the crater and severely impact the city and three adjacent regions. The International Airport had to remain closed for five days due to the falling ash, rain and poor visibility conditions. The Guatemalan Emergency and Disaster response team declared a red alert for those communities near the volcano and urged them to evacuate.

The eruption caused two deaths, Guatemalan news channel Noti-7 reporter Aníbal Archila being one of them; Archila was one of the first reporters to arrive to the scene. President Álvaro Colom declared a State of Emergency and the Secretary of Education suspended classes in the affected regions: Guatemala, Escuintla and Sacatepéquez. The Congress ratified the State of Emergency on 1 June 2010.

=== Tropical storm Agatha ===
On 29 May 2010, two days after the Pacaya eruption, Guatemala City was impacted by Tropical Storm Agatha, which caused an extreme amount of rain over a very short period. The sewerage system collapsed, creating a large sinkhole that practically swallowed a complete house, killing its three occupants. The piping feature, of larger dimensions than a street intersection, engulfed a three-story building and a house (14°39′7.50″N 90°30′21.5″W). This 2010 piping feature was at least 18 metres (59 feet) wide and 60 metres (200 feet) deep. The distance between the 2010 piping feature and the 2007 piping feature is about 2 kilometres (1.2 mi). Geologists Sam Bonis and T. Waltham argue that the recurring piping features in Guatemala City are caused by sewer leaks eroding the soft volcanic deposits that form the floor of the Valle de la Ermita.

== See also ==
- Santiago de los Caballeros de Guatemala
- Colonial Guatemala—Captaincy General of Guatemala
