= Carrera Theater (Guatemala) =

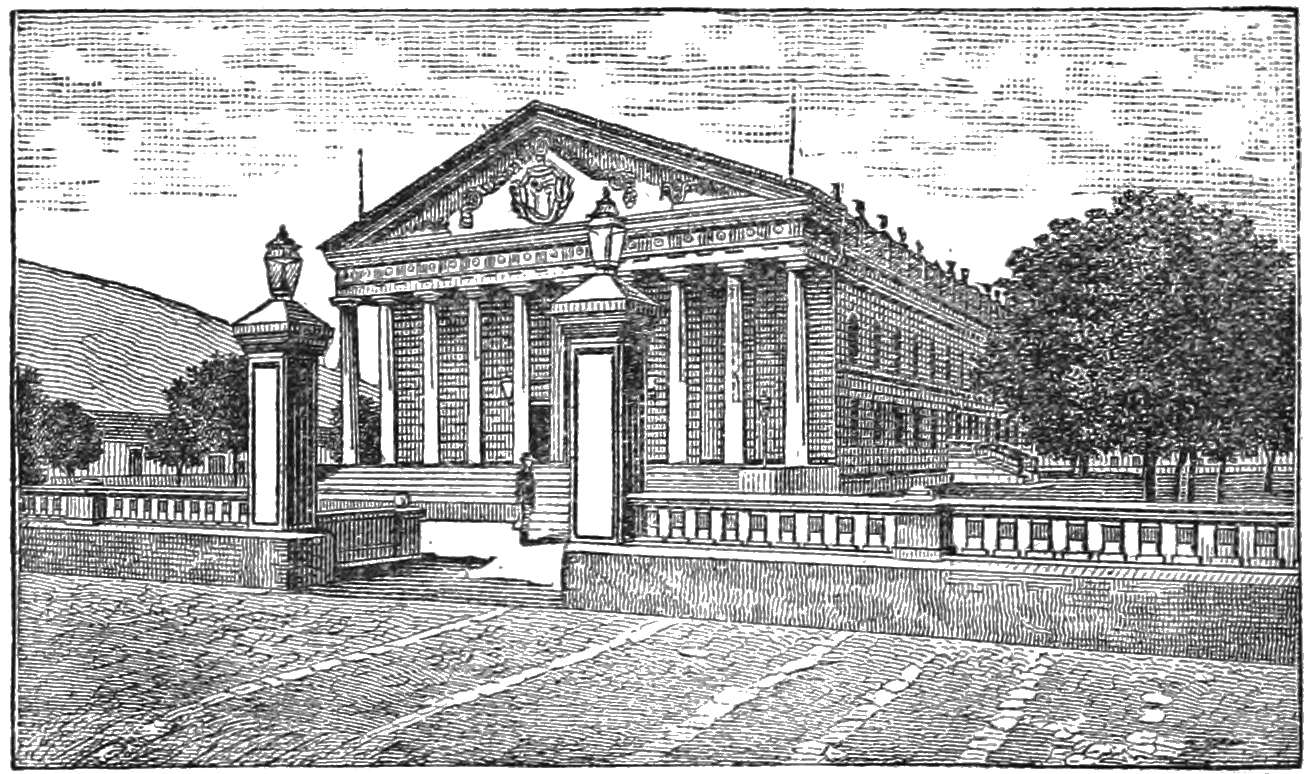
- Carrera Theater, original construction.
- Interactive map of the Carrera Theater area
- Former names: Teatro Carrera or Teatro Colón

General information
- Type: Theater
- Architectural style: Classic Greek
- Location: Guatemala City, Guatemala
- Coordinates: 14.6430556°N 90.51333333°W
- Construction started: 1852
- Inaugurated: 1858
- Renovated: 1892
- Demolished: 1923
- Owner: Government of Guatemala

Design and construction
- Engineer: Miguel Rivera Maestre; José Beckers

The Carrera Theater (also called Colón Theater after the Liberal Reform of 1871) was a majestic classic Greek style theater built by president Captain General Rafael Carrera y Turcios in Guatemala City, Guatemala in 1852. The building was in the Old Central Square and after the liberal revolution of 1871 it was called National Theater. Towards the end of general Manuel Lisandro Barillas Bercián government, the building was remodeled to celebrate the Discovery of America fourth centennial anniversary. Finally, the theatre was destroyed by the earthquakes of 1917–18 and demolished in 1923.

== Construction ==
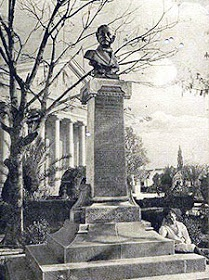
José Batres Montúfar bust, place in the newly remodeled Colón Theater in 1892.

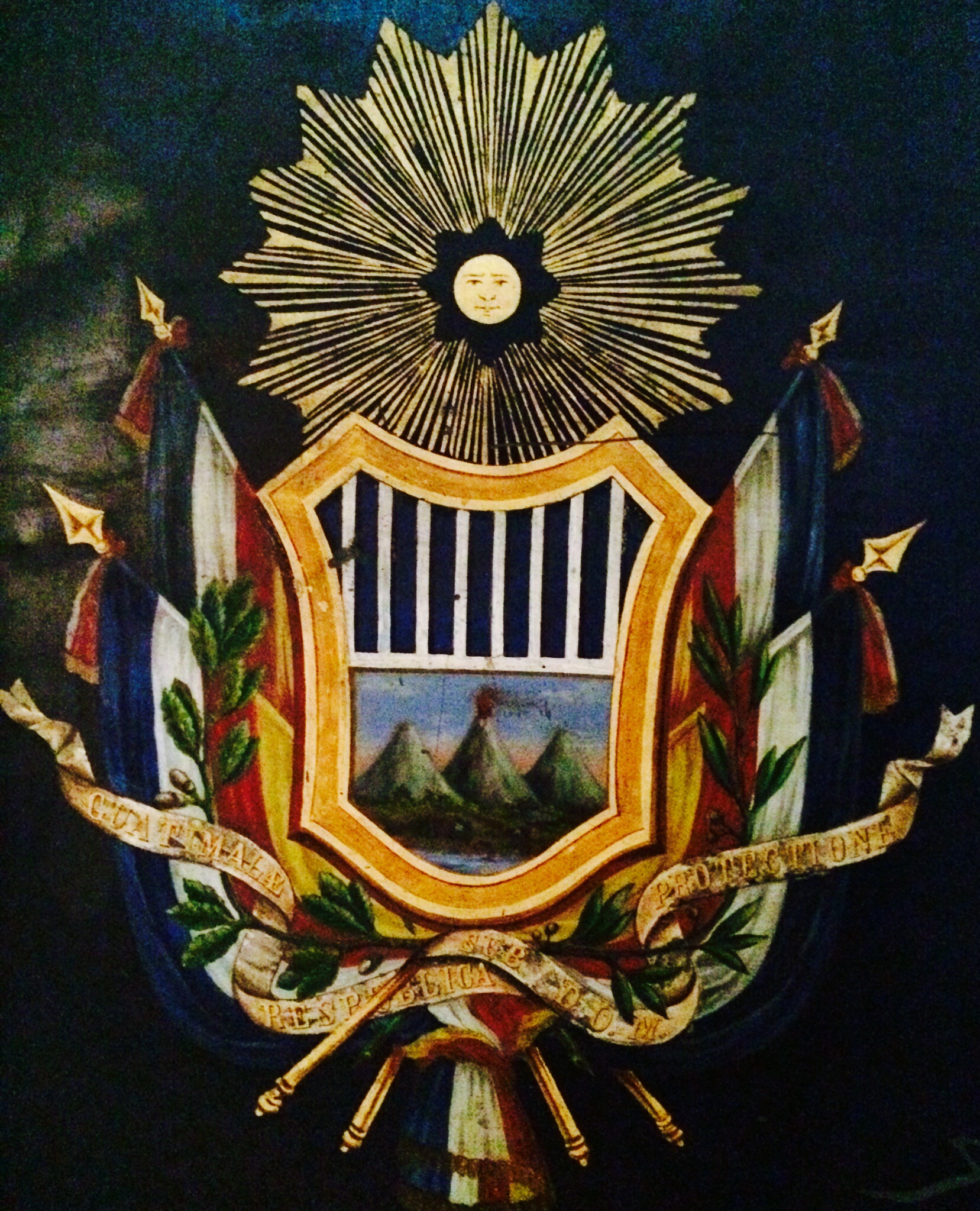
Coat of arms of the Republic of Guatemala between 1858 and 1871. A replica was carved on the front side of the theater before it was remodeled in 1892.

An enthusiastic fan of Opera, and following his mistress -Josefa Silva's advice (Note: González Davison (2008) "Ms. Silva was a professional actress and singer who had taught Rafael Carrera how to behave, write, read and sing.")-, president for life of Guatemala Rafael Carrera started the construction of a massive National Theater that was called "Carrera Theater" in his honor, and was located in the old Central Square. The Old Central Square was located to the northeast side of Guatemala City -then not larger than a tiny village- and in 1776 was used to place the first block of the new Nueva Guatemala de la Asunción after the 1773 earthquakes destroy Santiago de los Caballeros de Guatemala. The place had been chosen as the new city Central Square, saving the surroundings for the new Cathedral, Palace and houses for the richest families of the time, the Aycinena family, given that the family leader, Fermín de Aycinena, had contributed considerably to the move of the city from its old place. However, the design approved by the Spanish crown had the Central Square in a different location, and this one became the Old Central Square.

Years later it became a commercial site and on 6 August 1832, then State of Guatemala Governor, Dr. Mariano Gálvez, issued a decree to build a theater in the Old Central Square site. However, political climate was very tense in the country and when the civil war between liberal and conservative parties escalated, Galvez was overthrown and the theater could not be built.

The project was revisited in 1852, when Juan Matheu and Manuel Francisco Pavón Aycinena present Rafael Carrera with a new plan. Once approved, Carrera commissioned Matheu himself and Miguel Ruiz de Santisteban to build the theater. Initially it was in charge of engineer Miguel Rivera Maestre, but he quit after a few months and was replaced by German expert José Beckers, who built the Greek façades and added a lobby. This was the first monumental building ever built in the Republican era of Guatemala, given that in the 1850s the country finally was enjoying some peace and prosperity.

== Remodel and name change ==
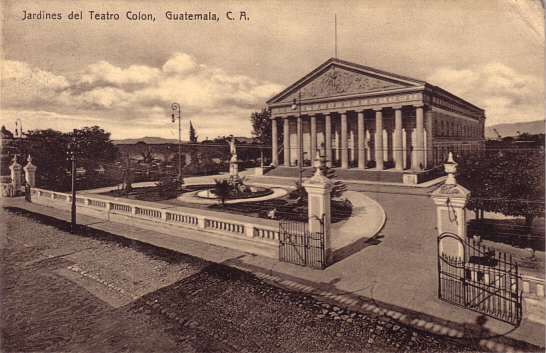
Colón Theater after its remodeling in 1892.

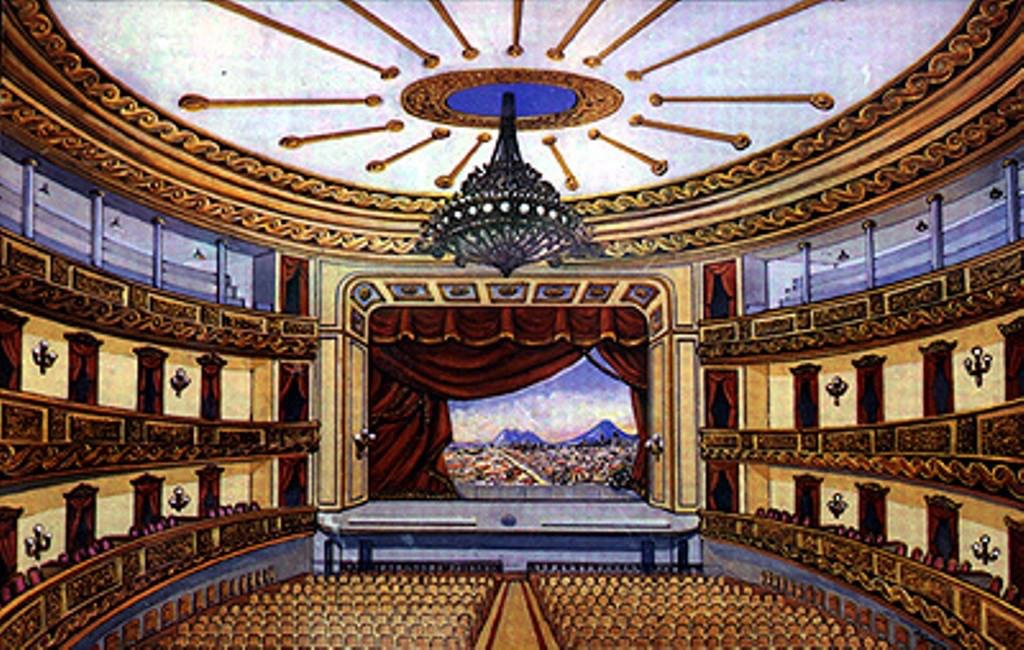
Colón Theater stage. Painting from 1890.

Appleton's Guide to México and Guatemala of 1884 describes the theater as follows: «In the middle of the square is the Theater, similar in size and elegance to any of the rest of Spanish America. Lines of orange trees and other nice trees of brilliant flowers and delicious fragrances surround the building while the statues and fountains placed at certain intervals enhance even more the beauty of the place.

After the Liberal reform from 1871, the theater was called National Theater. In 1892, it was refurbished, removing the conservative coat of arms from its façade and substituting it with a sculpture and inscriptions. The orange trees, fountains and sculptures were removed, and in their place modern gardens were planted and a bust of José Batres Montúfar was erected.

During the government of general Manuel Lisandro Barillas Bercián, the theater was remodeled to celebrate the Discovery of America fourth centennial anniversary; the Italian community in Guatemala donated a statue of Christopher Columbus -Cristóbal Colón, in Spanish- which was placed next to the theater. Since then, the place was called "Colón Theater".

== Destruction ==
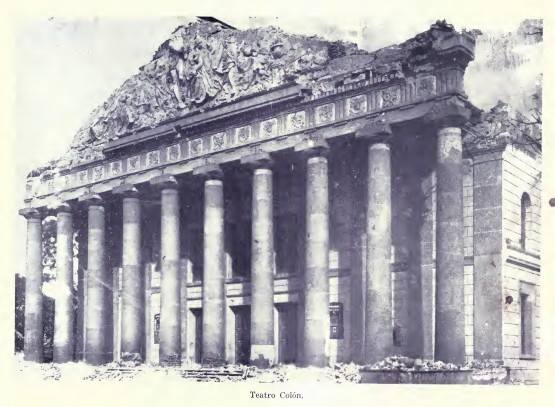
Carrera Theater after the 1917–1918 earthquakes. It was demolished in 1923.

The Colón Theater was destroyed by the 1917–18 earthquakes and remained in ruins until 1923; it was not demolished, due to the government of Manuel Estrada Cabrera incompetence to deal with the disaster, and then because of the Revolution of 1920 to depose Estrada Cabrera. Later on, the instability of the country lead to a coup de etat by general José María Orellana in 1921, who overthrew then president Carlos Herrera. In place of the theater a street market was built. (Note: The new street market was called simply "Colón" and remained in that place until 1948, when -after several years of lobbying- a new formal market was built across the street.)

== Bibliography ==
- Arévalo Martínez, Rafael (1945). ¡Ecce Pericles!. Guatemala: Tipografía Nacional.
- Conkling, Alfred R. (1884). Appleton's guide to Mexico, including a chapter on Guatemala, and a complete English-Spanish vocabulary. Nueva York: D. Appleton and Company.
- González Davison, Fernando (2008). La montaña infinita;Carrera, caudillo de Guatemala (in Spanish). Guatemala: Artemis y Edinter. ISBN 978-84-89452-81-7.
- Guateantaño (17 October 2011). "Parques y plazas antiguas de Guatemala". Guatepalabras Blogspot. Guatemala. Archived from the original on 27 January 2015.
- Hernández de León, Federico (1959). "El capítulo de las efemérides". Diario La Hora (in Spanish). Guatemala.
- Hernández de León, Federico (1930). El libro de las efemérides (in Spanish). Vol. Tomo III. Guatemala: Tipografía Sánchez y de Guise.
- Milla y Vidaurre, José (1980). Cuadros de Costumbres (in Spanish). Guatemala: Escolar Piedra Santa.
- Woodward, Ralph Lee Jr. (2002). "Rafael Carrera y la creación de la República de Guatemala, 1821–1871". Serie monográfica (in Spanish) (12). CIRMA y Plumsock Mesoamerican Studies. ISBN 0-910443-19-X. Archived from the original on 1 March 2019.
- Woodward, Ralph Lee Jr. (1993). Rafael Carrera and the Emergence of the Republic of Guatemala, 1821–1871 (Online edition). Athens, Georgia EE.UU.: University of Georgia Press. ISBN 978-0-8203-4360-0.
