= Mariano de Aycinena y Piñol =

Guatemalan merchant and politician

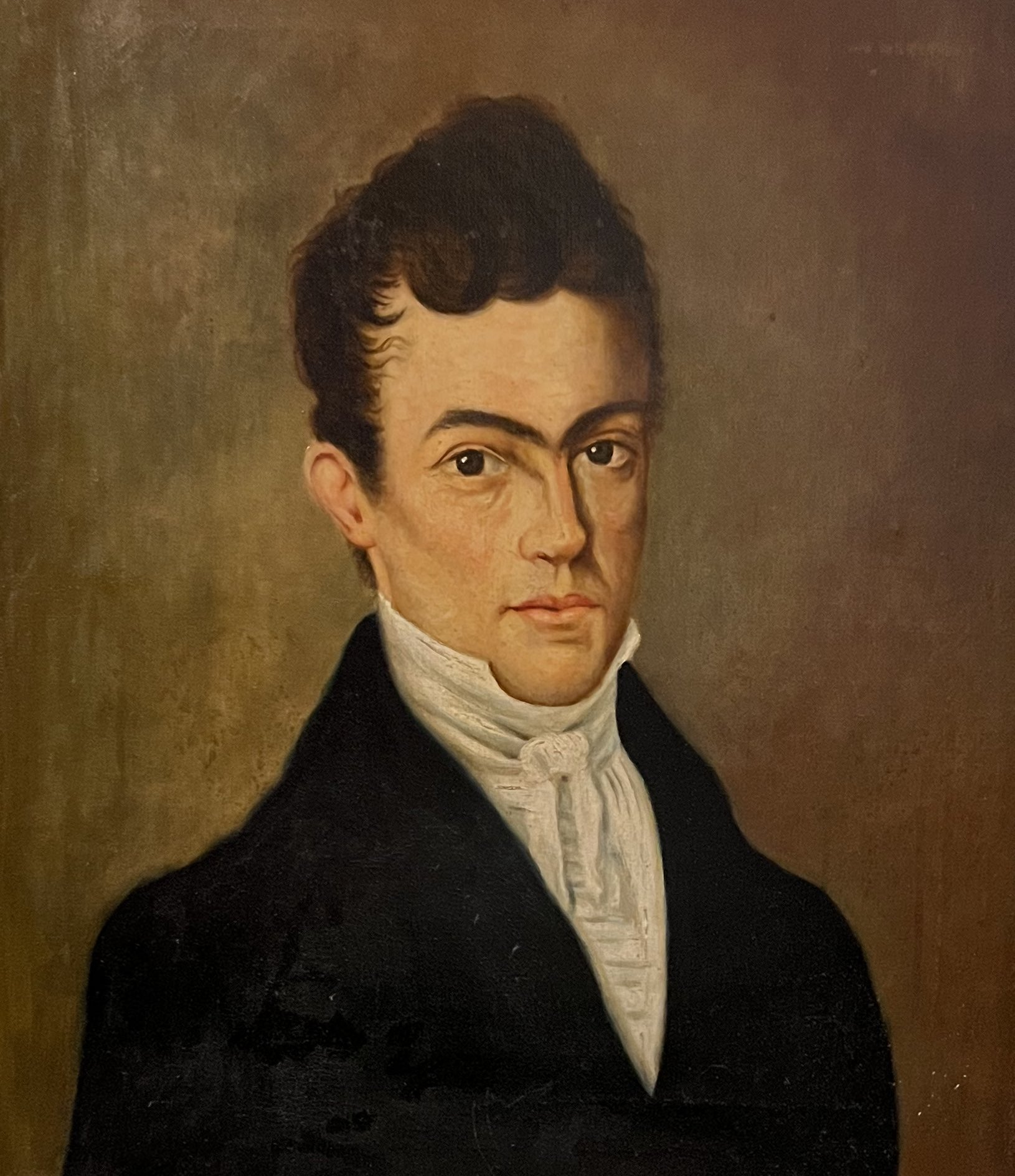

Governor of the State of Guatemala
- In office March 1, 1827 – April 12, 1829
- Preceded by: José Domingo Estrada
- Succeeded by: Francisco Morazán

Personal details
- Born: 16 September 1789 Captaincy General of Guatemala, Spanish Empire
- Died: 29 March 1855 (aged 65) Nueva Guatemala de la Asunción, Guatemala
- Education: Real y Pontificia Universidad de San Carlos Borromeo
- Occupation: Merchant; Lawyer; Politician

Mariano de Aycinena y Piñol (16 September 1789 – 29 March 1855) was a wealthy and influential Guatemalan merchant and an important conservative politician. A younger son of the first marquis of Aycinena, peninsular-born Juan Fermín de Aycinena (1729–1796), Mariano was a leader of Guatemalan independence from Spain. He served governor of the State of Guatemala in the Central American Federation from 1 March 1827 to 12 April 1829 and patriarch of the Aycinena family. The family had the commercial monopoly in Central American during the Spanish colonial era later year thanks to the Consulado de Comercio. He was one of the signatories of Central American independence and lobbied heavily for the annexation of Central America to the Mexican Empire of Agustín de Iturbide. This arrangement would keep the family's economic position and privileges following independence. After being expelled along with the Aycinena family in 1829 after being defeated by Francisco Morazán, went into exile in the United States and then to Mexico. He came back to Guatemala after the conservatives had allied with general Rafael Carrera; but then he retired from public life and transferred leadership of the Aycinena family to Juan José de Aycinena y Piñol.

== Biography ==
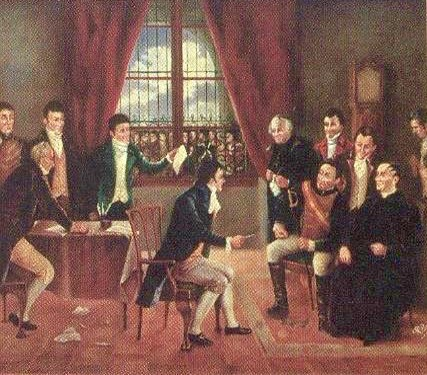
Signing of the Central America declaration of independence on September 15, 1821. Mariano de Aycinena is sitting at the center of this painting of Rafael Beltranena.

Member and leader of the most influential family in the Guatemalan region during the Spanish colonial era, he clashed with Captain General José de Bustamante y Guerra when Aycinena y Piñol was in charge of the Ayuntamiento (city council) in 1812. (Note: The ayuntamiento was locus of power for American-born Spaniards as opposed to the Audiencia, the high court, which was dominated by peninsular-born Spaniards.)

In 1821, Fernando VII power in Spain was weakened by French invasions and other conflicts, and Mexico declared the Plan de Iguala; this led Aycinena y Piñol and other criollos to demand the weak Captain General Gabino Gaínza to declare Guatemala and the rest of Central America as an independent entity. Aycinena y Piñol was one of the signatories of the Declaration of Independence of Central America from the Spanish Empire, and then lobbied strongly for the annexation of Central America to the Mexican Empire of Agustín de Iturbide, due to its conservative and ecclesiastical nature. Aycinena remained in the legislature and was advisor of the Governors of Guatemala in the next few years.

In October 1826, Central American Federation president Manuel José de Arce y Fagoaga dissolved the Legislature and tried to establish a Unitarian System for the region, switching from the Liberal to the Conservative party, that Aycinena led. The rest of Central America did not want this system; they wanted the Aycinena family out of power altogether, and therefore, the Central American Civil War (1826–1829) started. From this war emerged the dominant figure of the Honduran general Francisco Morazán.

=== Governor of the State of Guatemala ===
Aycinena was appointed as Governor of Guatemala on 1 March 1827 by president Manuel José Arce. His time in office was a dictatorship: he censored free press and any book with liberal ideology was forbidden. He also establisher Martial Law and the retroactive death penalty. He reinstated mandatory tithing for the secular clergy of the Catholic Church

=== Invasion of General Morazán in 1829 ===
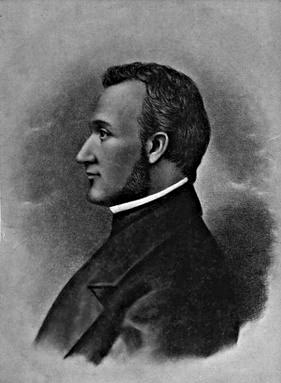
Liberal Honduran Caudillo Francisco Morazán.

Morazán and his liberal forces were fighting around San Miguel, in El Salvador beating any conservative federal forces sent by Guatemalan general Manuel Arzú from San Salvador. Then, Arzú decided to take matters in his own hands and left colonel Montúfar in charge of San Salvador and went after Morazan. After realizing that Arzu was after him, Morazan left for Honduras to look for more volunteers for his army. On September 20, Manuel Arzá was close to the Lempa River with 500 men, when he was notified that the rest of his army had capitulated in San Salvador. Morazan then went back to El Salvador with a considerable army and general Arzú, feigning a sickness, fled to Guatemala, leaving lieutenant colonel Antonio de Aycinena in command. Aycinena and his 500 troops were going to Honduras when they were intercepted by Morazan troops in San Antonio, forcing Aycinena to concede defeat on October 9. With Aycinena defeat, there were no more conservative federal troops in El Salvador. On October 23, general Morazán marched triumphally in San Salvador. A few days later, he went to Ahuachapán, to organize an army to take down the conservative aristocrats led by Mariano Aycinena y Piñol in Guatemala and establish a regime favorable to the central American Federation that was the dream of the liberal criollos.

Upon learning this, Aycinena y Piñol tried to negotiate with Morazán to no avail: Morazán was willing to take down the aristocrats at all costs.

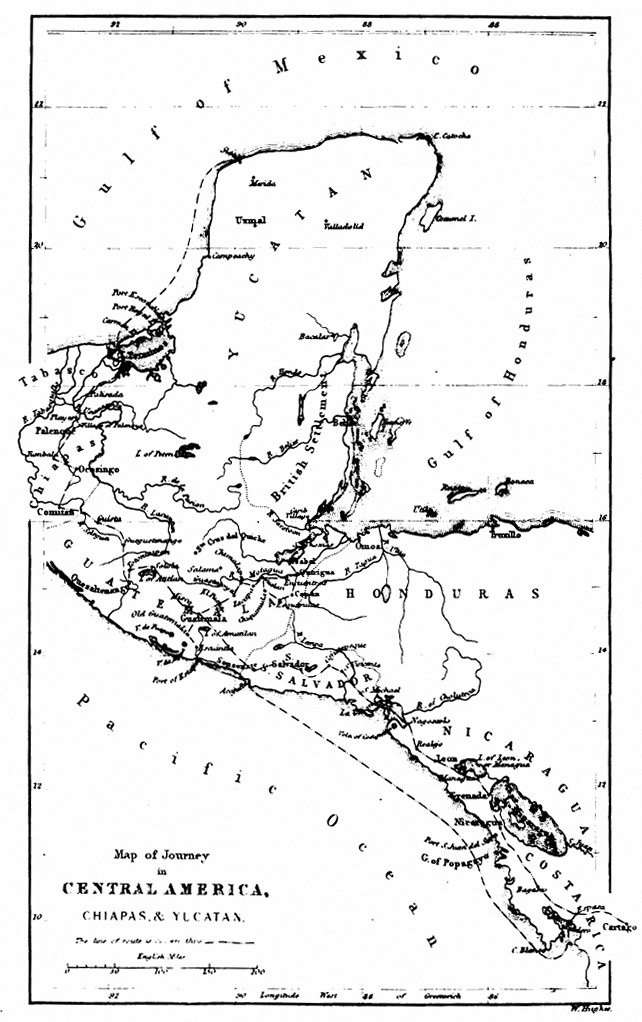
Map olf Guatemala in 1829. Note that borders with Mexico, Yucatán and Chiapas are not defined.

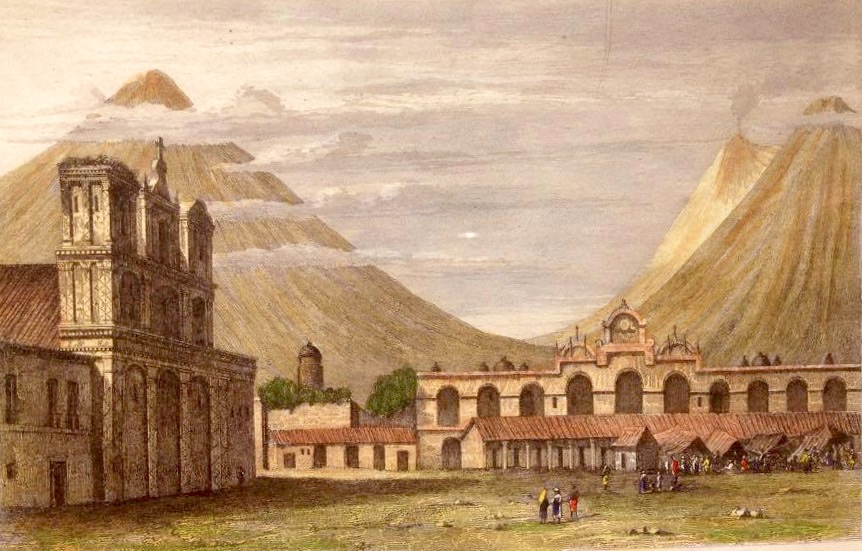
Plaza Central of Antigua Guatemala in 1829. the old Palacio de la Capitanía General was still destroyed after the 1773 earthquake.

After his victory in San Miguelito, Morazán's army increased in size given that a lot of voluntaries from Guatemala joined him. On March 15, when Morazan and his army were on their way to occupy their previous positions, they were intercepted by federal troops in Las Charcas. However, Morazán had a better position and smashed the federal army. The battle field was left littered with corpses, while the allies took a great number of prisoners and weaponry. The allies continued to recapture their old positions in San José Pinula and Aceituno, and place Guatemala City under siege once again. General Verveer, Ambassador from the ruler of The Netherlands and Belgium before the Central American government and who was in Guatemala to negotiate the construction of a transoceanic canal in Nicaragua, tried to mediate between the State of Guatemala and Morazán, but did not succeed. Military operations continued, with great success for the allies.

To prepare for the siege from Morazán troops, on 18 March 1829, Aycinena decreed martial law, but he was soundly defeated. On 12 April 1829, Aycinena conceded defeat and he and Morazán signed an armistice pact; then, he was sent to prison, along with his Cabinet members and the Aycinena family was secluded in their mansion. Morazán, however, annulled the pact on April 20, since his real objective was to take power away from the conservatives and the Catholic Church in Guatemala, whom the Central American leaders despised since they had had the commerce and power monopoly during the Spanish Colony.

In these battles Rafael Carrera was only a 15-year-old soldier, whose family suffered humiliation and mistreatment by Morazán's troops; José Batres Montúfar and Miguel García Granados also fought for Guatemala and were taken prisoners; and Manuel Francisco Pavón Aycinena, cousin of Aycinena y Piñol, was a lieutenant colonel in the Guatemalan Army.

== Exile ==
On 26 April 1829, from prison, Aycinena sent a letter a Morazán, protesting the pact annulment. He also pointed out to the liberal leader that there was no reason to break the pact and that, after all, he was the only responsible for what had happened and not the rest of the Aycinena family. But Morazán expelled all of them and most of the regular clergy from Central America and confiscated most of their belongings. He returned to Guatemala six years later, but had to go into exile once again, this time to Comitán, Mexico. Finally, he returned to Guatemala in 1837, was in the legislature and was in charge of the Consulado de Comercio -Conservartive Merchant association of Guatemala-.

== Death ==
Aycinena y Piñol returned to Guatemala after general Rafael Carrera established himself firmly in power. Aycinena retired from public life, handing over the Aycinena family leadership to Juan José de Aycinena y Piñol. He died in 1855, at a time that Manuel Francisco Pavón Aycinena had been successful in naming Carrera as president for Life and Guatemala was prosperous and in peace for the first time since the Independence.

== Bibliography ==
- Arce, Manuel José (1830). Memoria de la conducta pública y administrativa de Manuel José Arce, durante el periodo de su presidencia: escrita en defensa de las calumnias que contra su persona han vertido los mismos que se rebelaron contra el gobierno y la nación de Centro-América (in Spanish). Mexico: Imprenta de Galván á cargo de Mariano Arévalo. OCLC 054265435.
- Asociación de Amigos del País (2004). Diccionario histórico biográfico de Guatemala (in Spanish). Guatemala: Amigos del País, Fundación para la Cultura y el Desarrollo. ISBN 99922-44-01-1.
- Aycinena y Piñol, Mariano de (27 October 1828). Manifiesto del Jefe de Estado de Guatemala (in Spanish). Guatemala: Imprenta Mayor.
- Baronesa de Wilson (1888). Americanos célebres (in Spanish). Barcelona, España: Imp. Sucesores de N. Ramírez y C.
- Chandler, David L (1978). "The house of Aycinena". Revista de la Universidad de Costa Rica. San José, Costa Rica.
- Dunlop, Robert Glasgow (2013). Travels in Central America, 1847. London: Forgotten Books.
- Gobierno de Guatemala (1855). Nota fúnebre de Manuel Francisco Pavón Aycinena (in Spanish). Guatemala.
- González Davison, Fernando (2008). La montaña infinita;Carrera, caudillo de Guatemala (in Spanish). Guatemala: Artemis y Edinter. ISBN 978-84-89452-81-7.
- Hernández de León, Federico (1959). "El capítulo de las efemérides". Diario La Hora (in Spanish). Guatemala.
- Hernández de León, Federico (1930). El libro de las efemérides (in Spanish). Vol. Tomo III. Guatemala: Tipografía Sánchez y de Guise.
- Martínez Peláez, Severo (1988). Racismo y Análisis Histórico de la Definición del Indio Guatemalteco (in Spanish). Guatemala: Editorial Universitaria.
- Martínez Peláez, Severo (1990). La patria del criollo; ensayo de interpretación de la realidad colonial guatemalteca (in Spanish). Mexico: Ediciones en Marcha.
- Montúfar, Lorenzo; Salazar, Ramón A. (1892). El centenario del general Francisco Morazán (in Spanish). Guatemala: Tipografía Nacional.
- Morazán, Francisco (1942). Testamento y memorias (in Spanish). Honduras: Talleres tipográficos nacionales. p. 60. "Testamento y memorias del general Francisco Morazán: discursos y artículos relativos al héroe. Publicación conmemorativa del primer centenario de su muerte"
- Reyes, Rafael (1885). Nociones de Historia de El Salvador (in Spanish). San Salvador, El Salvador: Imprenta Francisco Sagrini.
- Rosa, Ramón (1974). Historia del Benemérito Gral. Don Francisco Morazán, ex Presidente de la República de Centroamérica (in Spanish). Honduras: Ministerio de Educación Pública, Ediciones Técnicas.
- Stephens, John Lloyd; Catherwood, Frederick (1854). Incidents of travel in Central America, Chiapas, and Yucatan. London, England: Arthur Hall, Virtue and Co.
- Weaver, Frederic S. (March 1999). "Reform and (Counter) Revolution in Post-Independence Guatemala: Liberalism, Conservatism, and Postmodern Controversies". Latin American Perspectives. 26 (2): 129–158. doi:10.1177/0094582X9902600207. S2CID 143757705.
- Woodward, Ralph Lee Jr. (2002). "Rafael Carrera y la creación de la República de Guatemala, 1821–1871". Serie monográfica (in Spanish) (12). CIRMA y Plumsock Mesoamerican Studies. ISBN 0-910443-19-X. Archived from the original on 2019-03-01.
- Woodward, Ralph Lee Jr. (1993). Rafael Carrera and the Emergence of the Republic of Guatemala, 1821-1871 (Online edition). Athens, GA: University of Georgia Press. ISBN 978-0-8203-4360-0.
- Wortman, Miles. Government and Society in Central America, 1680-1840. (1982)

Preceded by José Domingo Estrada (Acting)	Guatemala State Governor; 1 March 1827 - 12 April 1829	Succeeded by Mariano Zenteno (Acting)
