= Mariano Gálvez =

Guatemalan jurist and politician

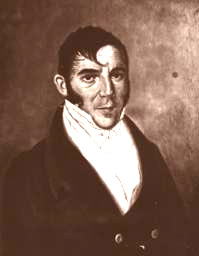
- Mariano Galvez in his youth

Governor of Guatemala
- In office 1831–1838

Personal details
- Born: c. 1794 Guatemala City, Captaincy General of Guatemala
- Died: March 29, 1862 Mexico City, Mexico
- Party: Liberal
- Occupation: Lawyer, politician

José Felipe Mariano Gálvez (c. 1794 – March 29, 1862 in Mexico) was a jurist and Liberal politician in Guatemala. For two consecutive terms from August 28, 1831, to March 3, 1838, he was chief of state of the State of Guatemala, within the Federal Republic of Central America. In 1836, he was elected a member of the American Philosophical Society.

== Background and early career ==
Born in the 1790s (some historians give the date August 29, 1790, others May 26, 1794), Gálvez was a foundling left in a basket at the house of Fray Toribio Carvajal. Carvajal gave the child in adoption to the family of Gertrudis Gálvez, one of the wealthiest families of the time, and he received their name. He dedicated himself to study, first at the convent school in Guatemala City and then in the law school at the Royal and Pontifical University of San Carlos Borromeo. He received a doctorate on December 16, 1819.

In the city council of Guatemala City he introduced the motion to end the war between Guatemala and El Salvador. He served as a private counselor to Gabino Gaínza during his administration of the State of Guatemala, and it is probably due to his influence that the latter did not strenuously oppose the popular movement for liberty. After independence, Gálvez favored annexation of Guatemala to Mexico. When the first federal Congress of Central America met in Guatemala in 1825, he was one of the deputies, and he became president of the Congress. In the civil war of 1826, Gálvez took part with the Federalists and headed a revolutionary movement against the Unitarian government, which, though promptly suppressed, hastened the invasion of Guatemala by federalist Francisco Morazán. Gálvez joined Morazán's forces in Ahuachapán.

== As chief of state of Guatemala ==
A member of the liberal party, Mariano Gálvez was appointed chief of state in 1831, during a period of turmoil that made governing difficult; after the expulsion of the conservative leader of the Aycinena family and the regular clergy in 1829, was appointed by Francisco Morazán as Governor of Guatemala in 1831. Liberal historians such as Ramón Rosa and Lorenzo Montúfar y Rivera, refer that he promoted major innovations in all aspects of the administration, to make it less dependent on the Catholic Church influence. It is also reported that he made public instruction independent of the Church, fostered science and the arts, eliminated religious festivals as holidays, founded the National Library and the National Museum, promoted respect for the laws and the rights of citizens, guaranteed freedom of the press and freedom of thought, established civil marriage and divorce, respected freedom of association and promulgating the Livingston Code (penal code of Louisiana), against much opposition from the population who was not used to the fast pace the changes were taking place; he also initiated judicial reform, reorganized municipal government and established a general head tax which severely impacted the native population. However, this were all changes that the liberals wanted to implement to eliminate the political and economic power of the aristocrats and of the Catholic Church -whose regular orders were expelled in 1829 and the secular clergy was weakened by means of abolishing mandatory tithing. (Note: Ramón Rosa and Lorenzo Montúfar y Rivera were the ideologists of the liberal trend in both Honduras and Guatemala, respectively, once the Liberal Reform took over power in Guatemala in 1871 and in Honduras in 1876 and their writings were biased against conservatives.)

Among his major errors was a contract made with Marshall Bennett—commercial partner of Francisco Morazán in the fine wood business—on 6 August 1834; the contract provided that the territories of Izabal, las Verapaces, Petén and Belize would be colonized within twenty years, but this proved impossible, plus made people irritated by having to deal with "heretics". In February 1835 Gálvez was reelected far a second term, during which the Asiatic cholera afflicted the country. The secular clergy that was still in the country, persuaded the uneducated people of the interior that the disease was caused by the poisoning of the springs by order of the government and turned the complaints against Gálvez into a religious war. Peasant revolts began in 1837, and under chants of "Hurray for the true religion!" and "Down with the heretics!" started growing and spreading. Gálvez asked the National Assembly to transfer the capital of the Federation from Guatemala City to San Salvador.

His major opponents were Colonel Manuel Montúfar and Juan de Dios Mayorga. José Francisco Barrundia and Pedro Molina, who had been his friends, came to oppose him in the later years of his government after he violently tried to repress the peasant revolt using a scorched earth approach against rural communities.

In 1838, Antigua Guatemala, Chiquimula and Salamá withdrew recognition of his government, and in February of that year Rafael Carrera's revolutionary forces entered Guatemala City asking for the cathedral to be opened to restore order in the Catholic communities, (Note: The Cathedral had remained closed since the archbishop and regular clergy had been expelled from Guatemala in 1829.) obliging Gálvez to relinquish power. Gálvez remained in the city after he lost power.

== Death ==
Gálvez died on March 29, 1862, in Mexico and was buried in the Cemetery of San Fernando. In 1925 his remains were repatriated and today they rest in the old School of Law in Guatemala City.

Universidad Mariano Gálvez de Guatemala, founded in 1966 in Guatemala City, is named after him.

== Notes and references ==
=== Bibliography ===
- González Davison, Fernando (2008). La montaña infinita; Carrera, caudillo de Guatemala (in Spanish). Guatemala: Artemis y Edinter. ISBN 978-84-89452-81-7.
- Montúfar, Lorenzo; Salazar, Ramón A. (1892). El centenario del general Francisco Morazán (in Spanish). Guatemala: Tipografía Nacional.
- Rosa, Ramón (1974). Historia del Benemérito Gral. Don Francisco Morazán, ex Presidente de la República de Centroamérica. Tegucigalpa: Ministerio de Educación Pública, Ediciones Técnicas Centroamericana.
- Woodward, Ralph Lee (1993). Rafael Carrera and the Emergence of the Republic of Guatemala, 1821–1871. Athens, GA: University of Georgia Press. ISBN 978-0820314488.
