= Manuel Barillas =

President of Guatemala from 1885 to 1892

General of Division Manuel Barillas
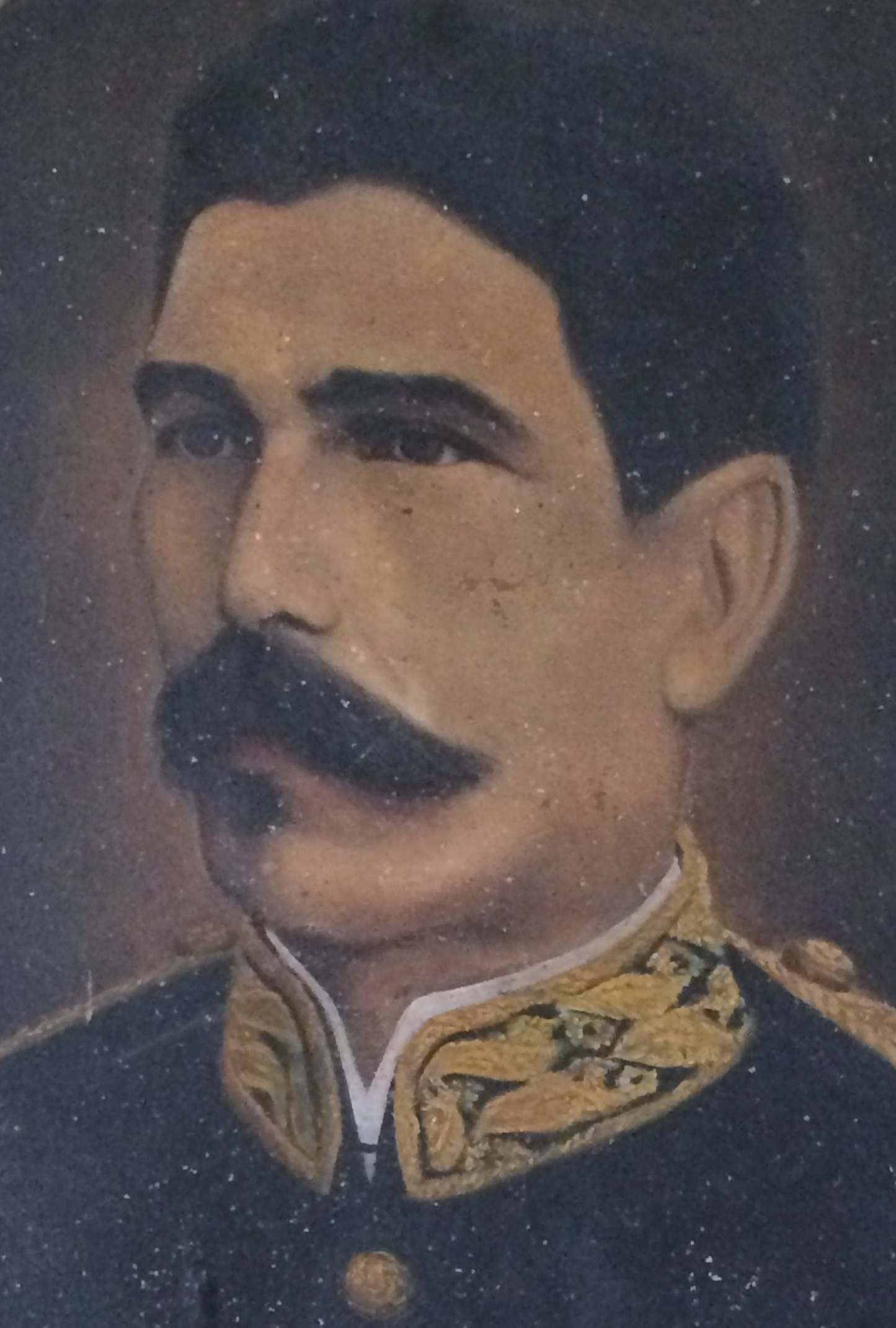

14th President of Guatemala
- In office 16 March 1886 – 15 March 1892; Acting: 6 April 1885 – 15 March 1886
- Preceded by: Alejandro M. Sinibaldi
- Succeeded by: José María Reina Barrios

Mayor of Quetzaltenango
- In office 1892–1893
- Preceded by: Manuel Estrada Cabrera

Personal details
- Born: Manuel Lisandro Barillas Bercián; 17 January 1845 Quetzaltenango, Guatemala
- Died: 7 April 1907 (aged 62) Mexico City, Mexico
- Party: Liberal
- Parent: José Onofre Barillas y Ponciana Bercián
- Occupation: Military General
- Nickname: "Man of tragic sevens" (because he died on 7 April 1907)

Manuel Lisandro Barillas Bercián (17 January 1845 – 7 April 1907) was a Guatemalan general and acting president of Guatemala from 6 April 1885 to 15 March 1886 and President from 16 March 1886 to 15 March 1892. He was born in Quetzaltenango, and assassinated (at the behest of his enemy Manuel Estrada Cabrera, President of Guatemala at the time) in Mexico City in 1907.

== Government ==
Barillas Bercián became interim president of Guatemala after the death of President Justo Rufino Barrios in the battle of Chalchuapa in El Salvador in April 1885, by means of a clever scam: he went to the General Cemetery when Barrios was being laid to rest and told the Congress president: "please prepare room and board for the 5,000 troops that I have waiting for my orders in Mixco". The congress president was scared by this, and declared Barillas interim president on the spot. By the time he realized that it was all a lie, it was too late to change anything.

Instead of calling for elections, as he should have, Barillas Bercián was declared President on 16 March 1886 and remained in office until 1892.

=== Remodelling Colón Theater ===
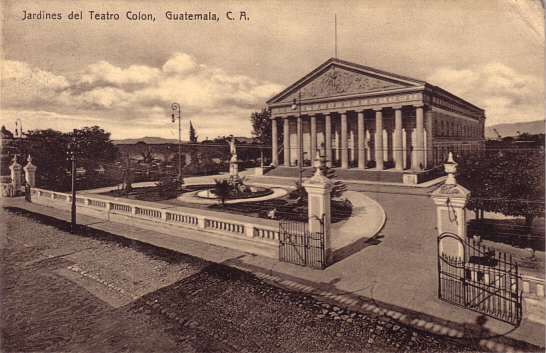
Colón Theater after its remodeling in 1892.

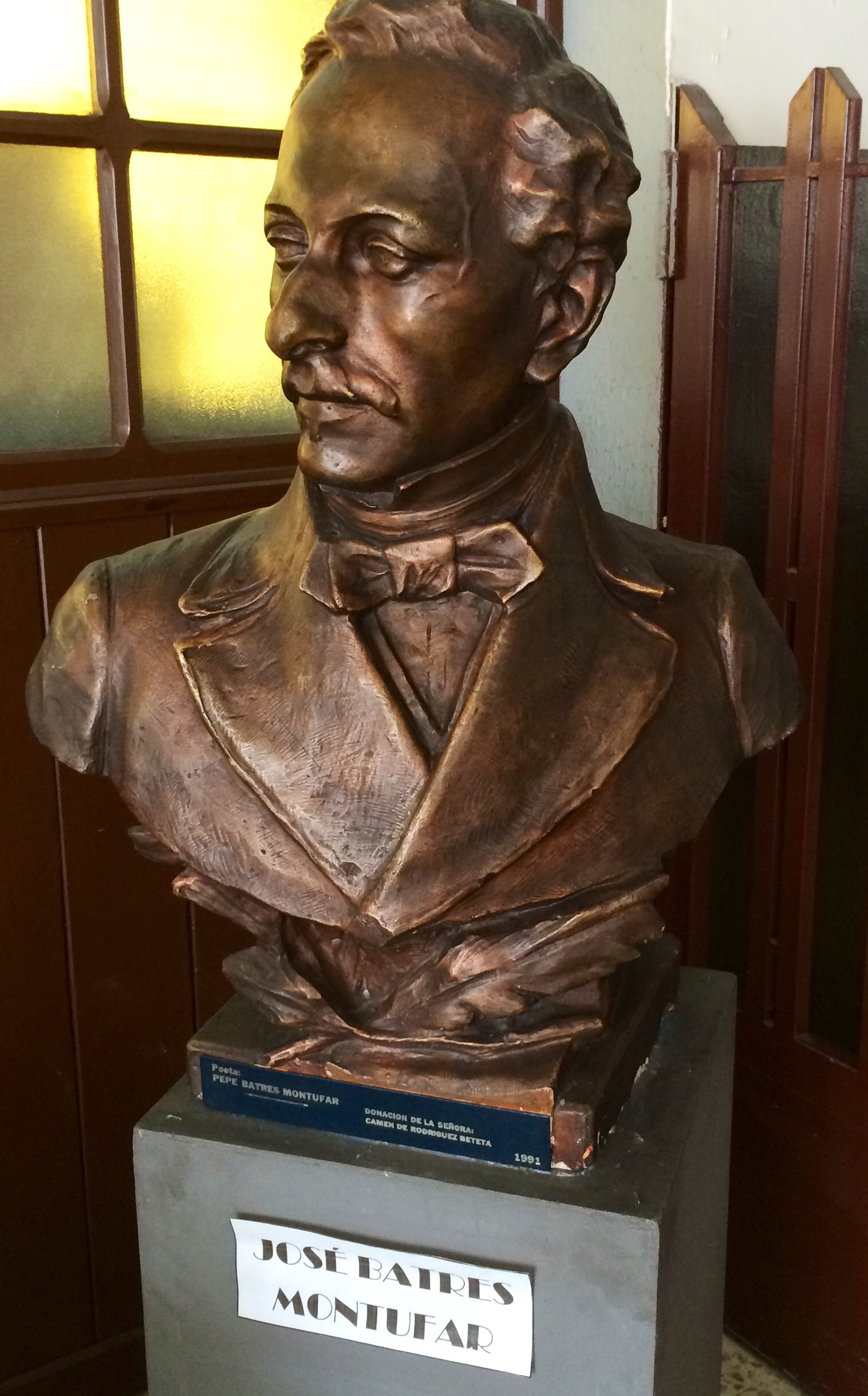
José Batres Montúfar bust that was originally placed at the Colón Theater in 1892. After the earthquakes of 1917–18, it was refurbished and donated to the Guatemala National Library.

In 1852, Juan Matheu and Manuel Francisco Pavón Aycinena presented Rafael Carrera with a plan to build a majestic National Theater, that would be called Carrera Theater in his honor. Once approved, Carrera commissioned Matheu himself and Miguel Ruiz de Santisteban to build the theater. Initially it was in charge of engineer Miguel Rivera Maestre, but he quit after a few months and was replaced by German expert José Beckers, who built the Greek façades and added a lobby. This was the first monumental building ever built in the Republican era of Guatemala, given that in the 1850s the country finally was enjoying some peace and prosperity.

Appleton's Guide to México and Guatemala of 1884 describes the theater as follows: «In the middle of the square is the Theater, similar in size and elegance to any of the rest of Spanish America. Lines of orange trees and other nice trees of brilliant flowers and delicious fragrances surround the building while the statues and fountains placed at certain intervals enhance even more the beauty of the place.

After the Liberal reform of 1871, the theater was called National Theater. In 1892, it was refurbished, removing the conservative coat of arms from its façade and substituting for it a sculpture and inscriptions. The orange trees, fountains and sculptures were removed, and in their place modern gardens were planted and a bust of José Batres Montúfar was erected.

During the government of general Barillas Bercián, the theater was remodeled to celebrate the Discovery of America fourth centennial anniversary; the Italian community in Guatemala donated a statue of Christopher Columbus -- Cristóbal Colón, in Spanish -- which was placed next to the theater. Since then, the place has been called "Colón Theater".

=== 1892 Presidential elections ===
General José María Reyna Barrios, nephew of former president Justo Rufino Barrios, made it back to Guatemala in time to run for office in the 1892 presidential elections, after Barillas had expelled him a few years earlier. It was the first election in Guatemala that allowed the candidates to make propaganda in the local newspapers. The candidates who ran for office were:

Name	Party	Supported by	Other information
Lorenzo Montúfar	Liberal	Liberal Club	He was the only one of all candidates who made an engraving of his portrait to publish it in the newspapers and was accused of wasting resources for doing this.
Francisco Lainfiesta	Liberal	None	Published his government proposal in the Diario de Centro America, taking advantage of the freedom of the Press that existed during Barillas' government.
José María Reyna Barrios	Liberal	Liberal Club	Eventual winner.
Miguel Enríquez	Conservative	Conservative Party	Enríquez had been a liberal, but became a conservative after the persecution that he suffered from the Barillas administration.
José Carranza Llerena	Conservative	None	Medical Staff of President Barillas.

Barillas Bercian was unique among all liberal presidents of Guatemala between 1871 and 1944: he handed over power to his successor peacefully. When election time approached, he sent for the three Liberal candidates to ask them what their government plan would be. The following anecdote recounts better what happened then:

First arrived lawyer Francisco Lainfiesta, and General Barillas, with the friendliest of smiles, said: "Mr. Lainfiesta: you are one of the candidates in the upcoming elections and perhaps the more likely to win. Therefore, I would like to know what your attitude and your political system of government will be, if you get to win. Especially, I would like to know your attitude about my person; because I have made my mistakes, I do not deny it. I was a simple worker at my carpentry when General Justo Rufino Barrios sent for me to be appointed second presidential designate. I would therefore, Mr. Lainfiesta, know what conduct you will observe towards me." Mr. Lainfiesta said: General Barillas: if luck would favor me with the election victory, my government will be based on strict adherence to the Constitution; the law would be the law and anyone who has acquired some responsibility, will have to answer for it before the relevant courts. A firm and righteous compliance with the constitutional provisions shall be the standard of my conduct as president. Very well said general Barillas, and both parted cordially.

Barillas then brought in Dr. Montúfar and interrogated him in the same or similar way as he had done Mr. Lainfiesta. Dr. Montúfar responded in similar terms as Lainfiesta, stressing his claims to obedience of the Constitution and strict enforcement.

Finally general Reyna Barrios came in; when in the midst of pleasant conversation, General Barillas repeated his question, and Reyna replied, with a sincere smile: We should not even talk about that, general; because you and I are the same. Rest assured that I will know how to respect and protect you. And then both shook hands with effusion. By the election period, the first two days of voting favored Lainfiesta. But by the third day, a huge column of Quetzaltenango and Totonicapán Indigenous people came down from the mountains to vote for general Reyna Barrios. The official agents did their job: Reyna was elected president and, not to offend the losing candidates, Barillas gave them checks to cover the costs of their presidential campaigns. Reyna Barrios, of course, received nothing, but he went on to become President on 15 March 1892.

== After the government ==
Barillas stayed in Guatemala busy with his land properties during the government of Reyna Barrios – he owned the "La Aurora" finca near Guatemala City – but when Reyna was murdered in 1898 after his attempt to extend his term, Barillas had to go into exile in Mexico, as the new president, Manuel Estrada Cabrera, was his personal enemy. In Mexico, Barillas was involved in several conspiracies to take over the Guatemalan government.

== Death ==
Barillas Bercián was assassinated in Mexico City (Note: The street running behind Palacio Nacional in El Zocalo plaza in Mexico city, called Calle Guatemala, is where the assassins sent by Manuel Estrada Cabrera murdered Manuel Lisandro Barillas.) on 7 April 1907 by two assassins sent to kill him by President Manuel Estrada Cabrera, who had lost patience with the constant conspiracies led by Barillas while in exile in Mexico. The two murderers were from Estrada Cabrera's personal guard, and never thought that they could be prosecuted for this crime, as they were accustomed to perpetrate crimes under total impunity in Guatemala. Once captured, they were interrogated and confessed that two senior officials in the Guatemalan government had sent them to Mexico to kill Barillas.

== Portraits ==
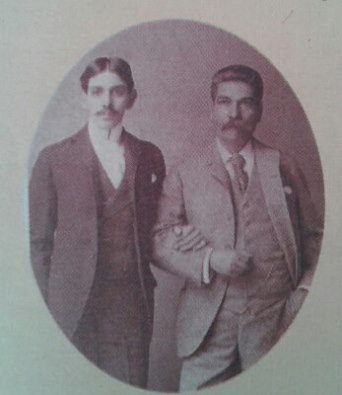

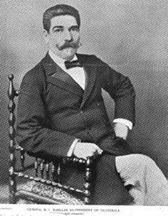

== Notes ==
Preceded by Alejandro M. Sinibaldi (acting)	President of Guatemala; 1885–1892	Succeeded by José María Reina Barrios
