= Manuel Francisco Pavón Aycinena =

Political Figure

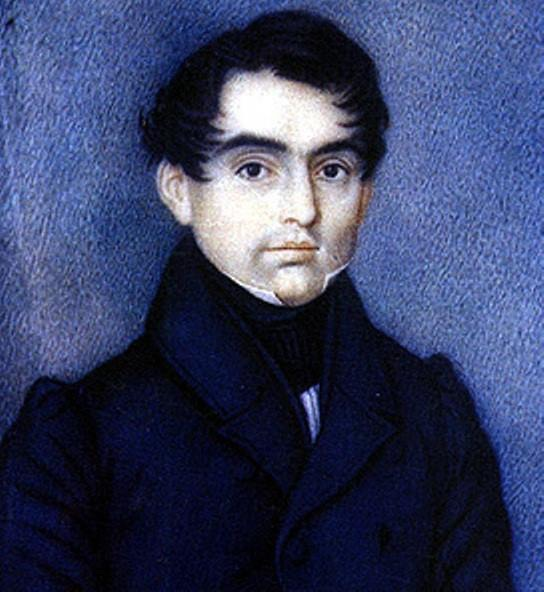

Government Advisor of Guatemala
- In office 1844–1848
- President: Rafael Carrera

Secretary of State of Guatemala (Note: Pavón Aycinena served also as War, Justice, Foreign Affairs and Ecclesiastical Affairs secretary under Rafael Carrera and Mariano Paredes.)
- In office November 6, 1852 – April 19, 1855
- President: Rafael Carrera

Personal details
- Born: January 30, 1798 Nueva Guatemala de la Asunción
- Died: April 19, 1855 (aged 57)
- Party: Conservative
- Education: Pontifical University of San Carlos Borromeo
- Occupation: Politician

Manuel Francisco Pavón Aycinena (January 30, 1798 – April 19, 1855) was a conservative Guatemalan politician during the regime of General Rafael Carrera. He was influential in the founding of the government's executive branch and held several Cabinet offices during his career.

== Biography ==
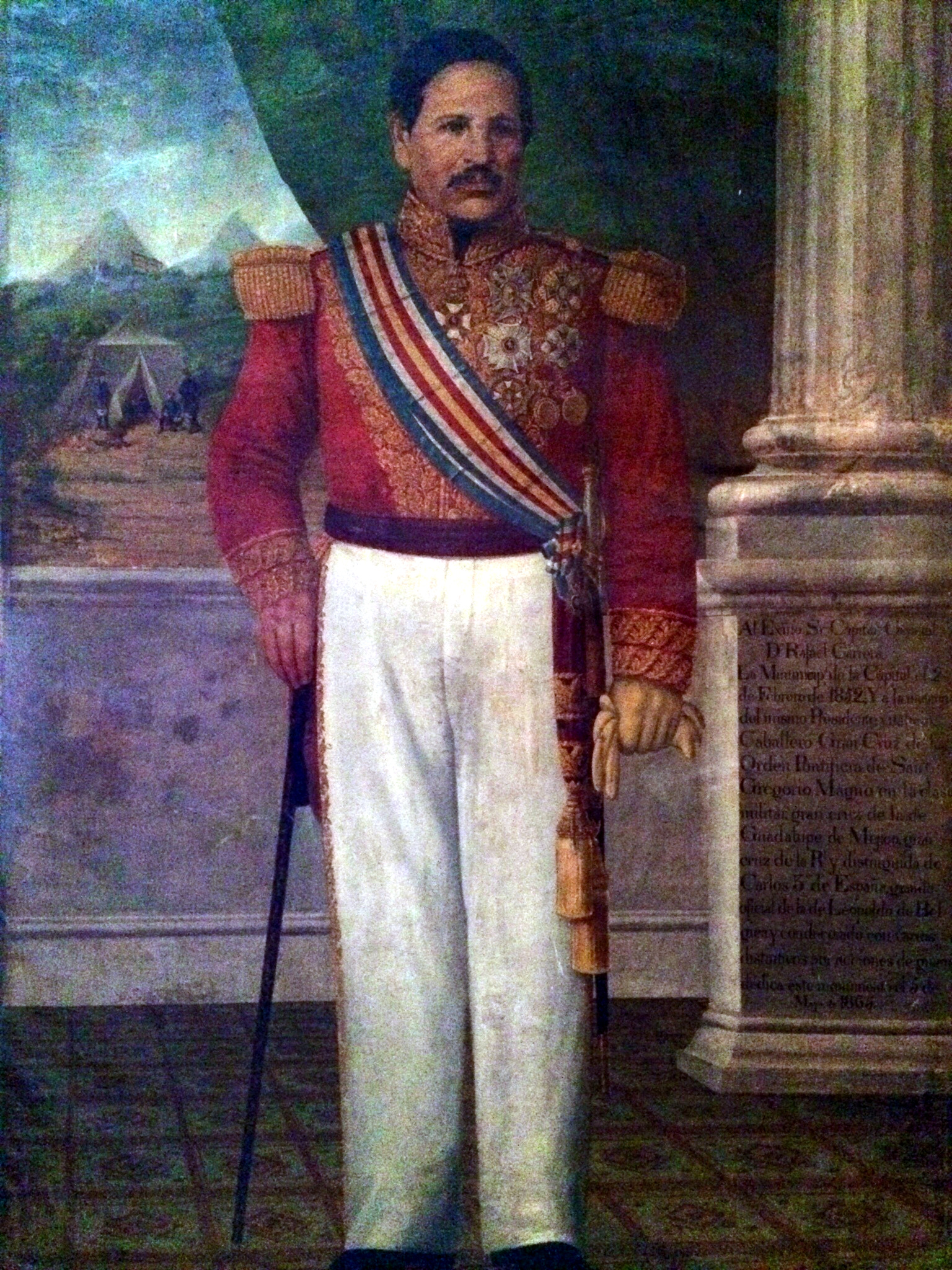
Captain General Rafael Carrera, president for life of Guatemala

Pavón Aycinena attended the Pontifical University of San Carlos Borromeo and participated in the war against Francisco Morazán under the command of the Governor of Guatemala, Mariano de Aycinena y Piñol as Lieutenant Colonel in the army. After his defeat, Aycinena was banished by Morazan. In his exile, Aycinena lived in Panama and the United States. He returned to Guatemala in 1837 when Rafael Carrera came to power.

== Role in Rafael Carrera's government ==
=== Carrera Theater ===
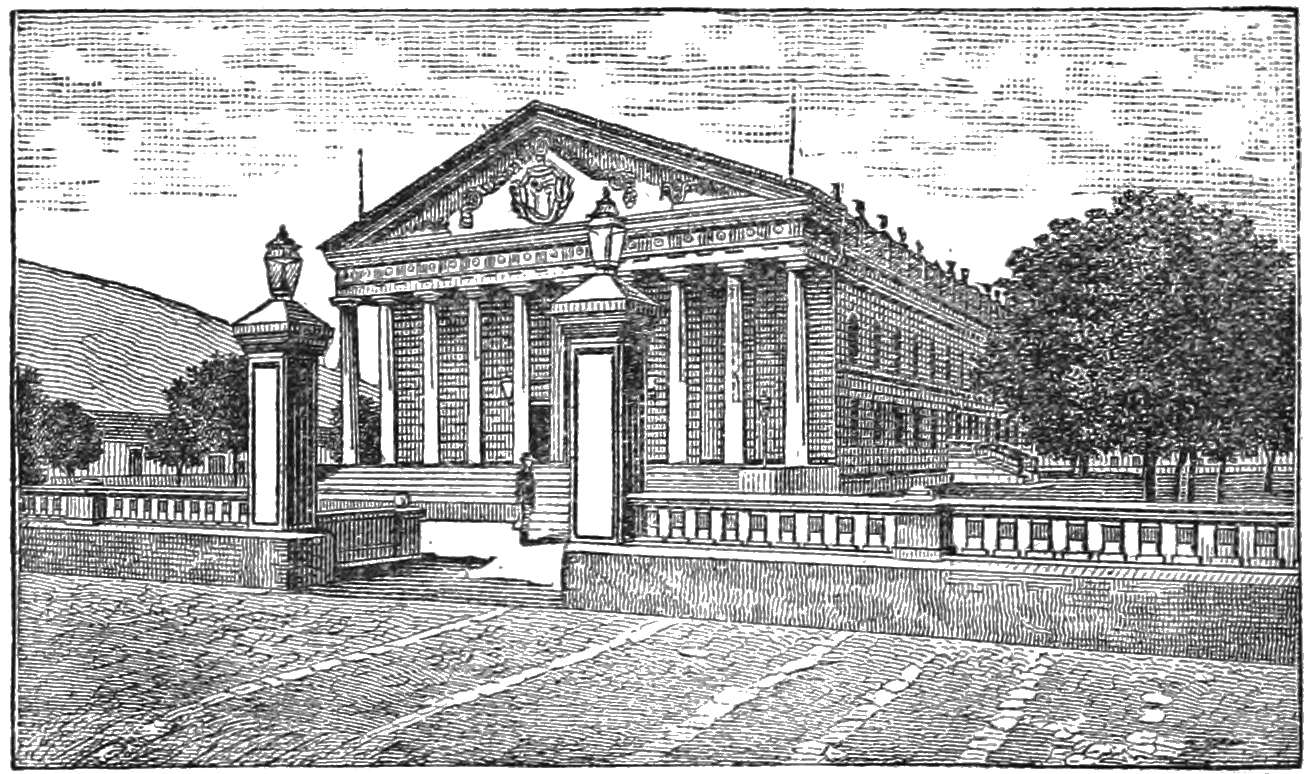
Carrera Theater.

On August 6, 1832, Guatemalan Governor Mariano Gálvez issued a decree to build a theater in the middle of Plaza Vieja. However, due to ongoing political turmoil, this theater was not constructed during Galvez's rule.

In 1852, Juan Matheu and Pavón Aycinena presented Rafael Carrera with a plan to build the Carrera Theater.

=== Carrera declared President for life ===
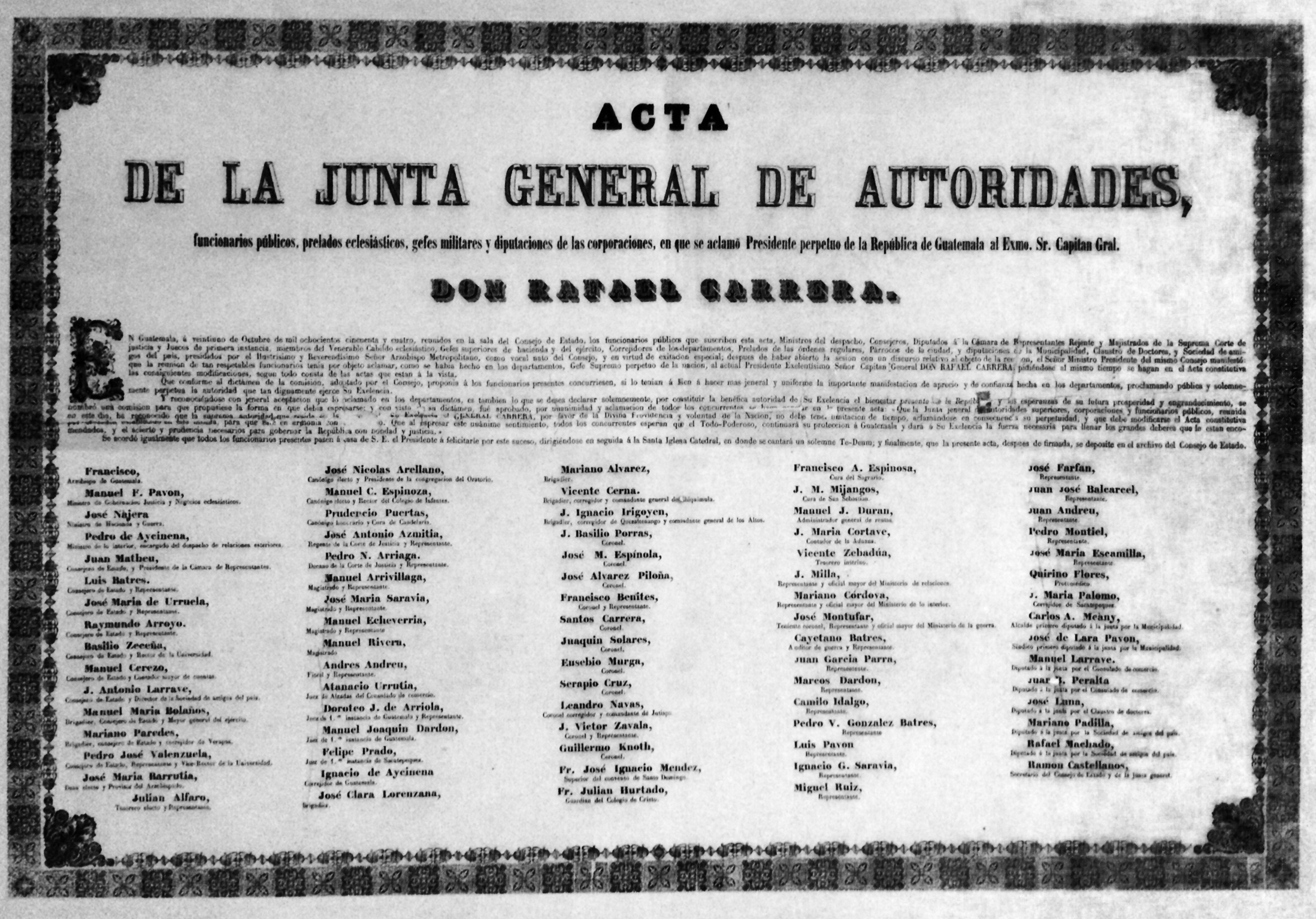
Copy of the decree by which Rafael Carrera was appointed President for Life of Guatemala in 1854 at the initiative of Pavón Aycinena

Shortly after Carrera became President in 1851, Pavón Aycinena began suffering from intestinal problems. On May 5, 1853, he became so ill that was put in a hospice, though he briefly recovered. On October 25, 1854, at the initiative of Pavón Aycinena, Carrera was declared "supreme and perpetual leader of the nation" for life, with the power to choose his successor; Carrera served as President of Guatemala until he died on April 14, 1865.

== Death ==
In February 1855, while Pavón Aycinena was traveling in Escuintla, his health rapidly declined. He returned to Guatemala City on March 17, and on April 15, a priest was called to perform Pavón's Last Rites. Pavón Aycinena named his cousins Pedro de Aycinena and Luis Batres Juarros as executors of his will.

Pavón Aycinena died in his home on April 19, 1855, surrounded by his relatives and important ecclesiastic figures. His funeral service took place in the Cathedral of Guatemala City and he was buried in La Merced Church.

On May 7, 1855, Carrera commanded that a portrait of Pavón Aycinena be placed in the main room of the Presidential Palace. Carrera also granted Pavón Aycinena's widow a lifelong pension equivalent to half of her deceased husband's income, —the largest pension ever granted in Guatemala up to that point.

== See also ==
- Francisco Morazán
- History of Guatemala
- History of Central America

== Notes and references ==
=== Bibliography ===
- Conkling, Alfred R. (1884). Appleton's guide to Mexico, including a chapter on Guatemala, and a complete English-Spanish vocabulary. Nueva York: D. Appleton and Company.
- Chandler, David L (1978). "The house of Aycinena". Revista de la Universidad de Costa Rica (in Spanish). San José, Costa Rica.
- Gobierno de Guatemala (1855). Nota fúnebre de Manuel Francisco Pavón Aycinena (in Spanish). Guatemala.
- González Davison, Fernando (2008). La montaña infinita;Carrera, caudillo de Guatemala (in Spanish). Guatemala: Artemis y Edinter. ISBN 978-84-89452-81-7.
- Guateantaño (17 October 2011). "Parques y plazas antiguas de Guatemala". Guatepalabras Blogspot. Guatemala. Archived from the original on 27 January 2015.
- Hernández de León, Federico (1959). "El capítulo de las efemérides". Diario La Hora (in Spanish). Guatemala.
- Hernández de León, Federico (1930). El libro de las efemérides (in Spanish). Vol. Tomo III. Guatemala: Tipografía Sánchez y de Guise.
- La Gaceta de Guatemala (30 June 1828). "Parte no oficial". La Gaceta de Guatemala (in Spanish) (6). Guatemala: Imprenta de La Unión.
- — (1855). "Noticia biográfica del señor D. Manuel Francisco Pavón, Consejero de Estado y Ministro de lo Interior del gobierno de la República de Guatemala". La Gaceta de Guatemala (in Spanish). VII (58–62). Guatemala: Imprenta La Paz, Palacio de Gobierno de Guatemala.
- Martínez Peláez, Severo (1988). Racismo y Análisis Histórico de la Definición del Indio Guatemalteco (in Spanish). Guatemala: Editorial Universitaria.
- Martínez Peláez, Severo (1990). La patria del criollo; ensayo de interpretación de la realidad colonial guatemalteca (in Spanish). México: Ediciones en Marcha.
- Milla y Vidaurre, José (1980). Cuadros de Costumbres (in Spanish). Guatemala: Escolar Piedra Santa.
- Molina Moreira, Marco Antonio (1979). Manuel Francisco Pavón Aycinena, constructor del sistema político del Régimen de los Treinta Años (PDF). Tesis (in Spanish). Guatemala: Escuela de Historia de la Universidad de San Carlos de Guatemala.
- Montúfar, Lorenzo; Salazar, Ramón A. (1892). El centenario del general Francisco Morazán (in Spanish). Guatemala: Tipografía Nacional.
- Rosa, Ramón (1974). Historia del Benemérito Gral. Don Francisco Morazán, ex Presidente de la República de Centroamérica (in Spanish). Honduras: Ministerio de Educación Pública, Ediciones Técnicas.
- Stephens, John Lloyd; Catherwood, Frederick (1854). Incidents of travel in Central America, Chiapas, and Yucatan. London, England: Arthur Hall, Virtue and Co.
- Weaver, Frederic S. (March 1999). "Reform and (Counter) Revolution in Post-Independence Guatemala: Liberalism, Conservatism, and Postmodern Controversies". Latin American Perspectives. 26 (2): 129–158. doi:10.1177/0094582X9902600207. S2CID 143757705.
- Woodward, Ralph Lee Jr. (2002). "Rafael Carrera y la creación de la República de Guatemala, 1821–1871". Serie monográfica (in Spanish) (12). CIRMA y Plumsock Mesoamerican Studies. ISBN 0-910443-19-X. Archived from the original on 2019-03-01.
- Woodward, Ralph Lee Jr. (1993). Rafael Carrera and the Emergence of the Republic of Guatemala, 1821-1871 (Online edition). Athens, Georgia EE.UU.: University of Georgia Press. ISBN 978-0-8203-4360-0.
