= José Batres Montúfar =

Guatemalan politician and writer

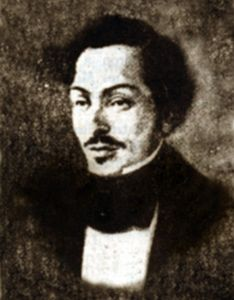

José Batres Montúfar (1809–1844) was a Guatemalan poet, politician, engineer and military figure.

== Monument ==
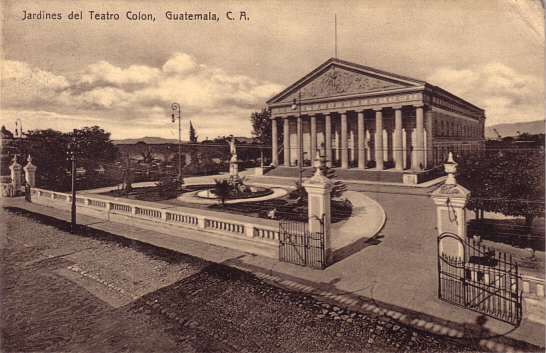
Colón Theater after its remodeling in 1892.

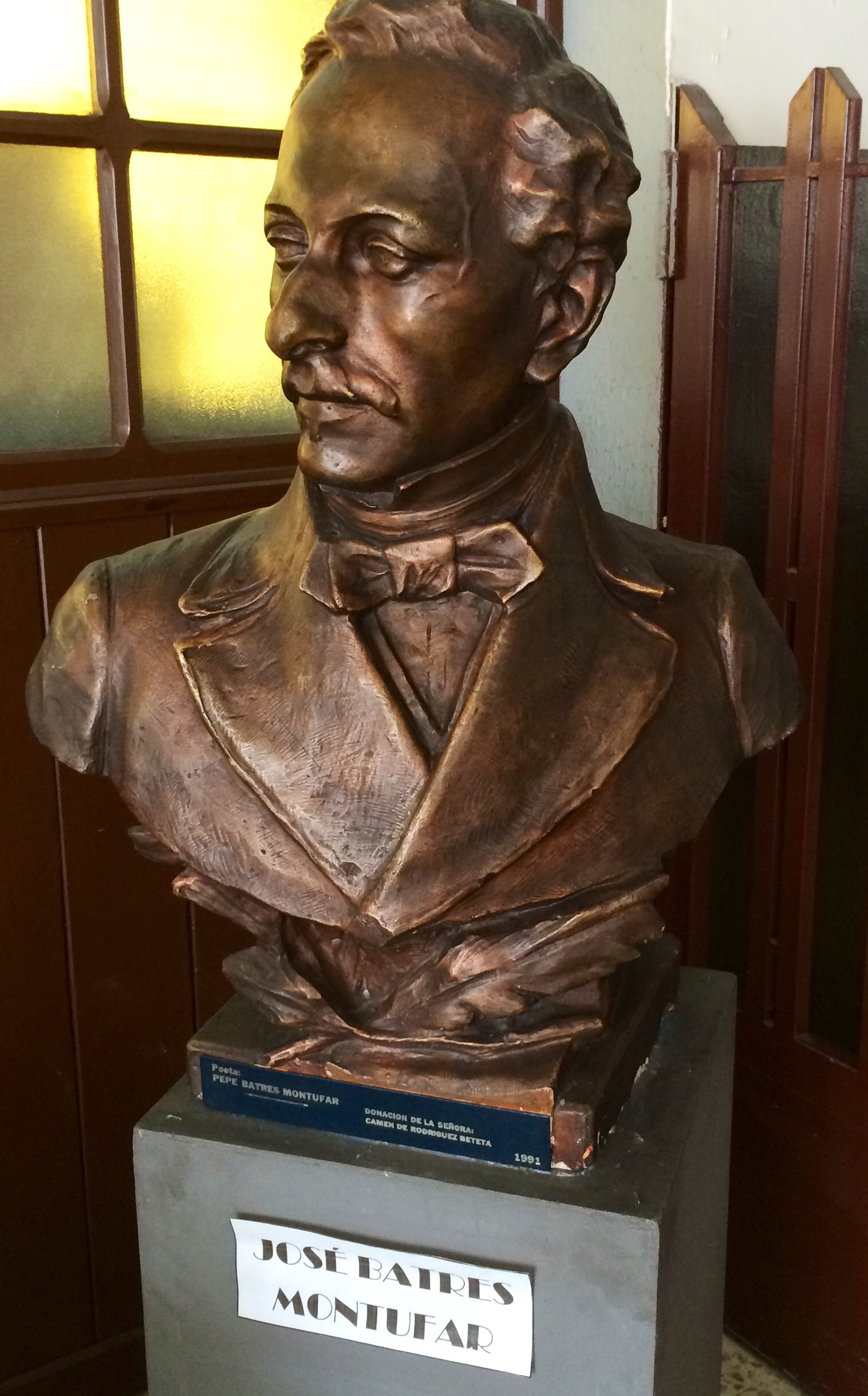
José Batres Montúfar bust that was originally placed at the Colón Theater in 1892. After the earthquakes of 1917–18, it was refurbished and donated to the Guatemala National Library.

In 1852, Juan Matheu and Manuel Francisco Pavón Aycinena presented Rafael Carrera with a plan to build a majestic National Theater, that would be called Carrera Theater in his honor. Once approved, Carrera commissioned Matheu himself and Miguel Ruiz de Santisteban to build the theater. Initially it was in charge of engineer Miguel Rivera Maestre, but he quit after a few months and was replaced by German expert José Beckers, who built the Greek façades and added a lobby. This was the first monumental building ever built in the Republican era of Guatemala, given that in the 1850s the country finally was enjoying some peace and prosperity.

Appleton's Guide to México and Guatemala of 1884 describes the theater as follows: «In the middle of the square is the Theater, similar in size and elegance to any of the rest of Spanish America. Lines of orange trees and other nice trees of brilliant flowers and delicious fragrances surround the building while the statues and fountains placed at certain intervals enhance even more the beauty of the place.

After the Liberal reform from 1871, the theater was called National Theater. In 1892, it was refurbished, removing the conservative Coat of Arms from its façade and substituting it with a sculpture and inscriptions. The orange trees, fountains and sculptures were removed, and in their place modern gardens were planted and a bust of Batres Montúfar was erected.

During the government of general Manuel Lisandro Barillas Bercián, the theater was remodeled to celebrate the Discovery of America fourth centennial anniversary; the Italian community in Guatemala donated a statue of Christopher Columbus -Cristóbal Colón, in Spanish- which was placed next to the theater. Since then, the place was called «Colón Theater».

== Literary works ==
Rubén Darío considers two of Batres' poems, Reloj, and Falsas apariencias, "little gems" of American literature.

== Bibliography ==
- Arévalo Martinez, Rafael (1945). ¡Ecce Pericles! (in Spanish). Guatemala: Tipografía Nacional.
- Castellanos, Lorena (2014). "Vida y obra de José María Reyna Barrios" (in Spanish). Guatemala: Francisco Marroquín University.
- Conkling, Alfred R. (1884). Appleton's guide to Mexico, including a chapter on Guatemala, and a complete English-Spanish vocabulary. Nueva York: D. Appleton and Company.
- De los Ríos, Efraín (1948). Ombres contra Hombres (in Spanish) (2nd ed.). México: Fondo de la Cultura de la Universidad de México.
- Fernández Alfaro, Joaquin Alberto (2014). El Canciller Montúfar (in Spanish) (1st. ed.). San José, Costa Rica: Instituto Manuel María de Peralta, Ministerio de Relaciones Exteriores y Culto de Costa Rica. p. 384.
- González Davison, Fernando (2008). La montaña infinita;Carrera, caudillo de Guatemala (in Spanish). Guatemala: Artemis y Edinter. ISBN 978-84-89452-81-7.
- Guateantaño (17 October 2011). "Parques y plazas antiguas de Guatemala". Guatepalabras Blogspot. Guatemala. Archived from the original on 27 January 2015.
