= Ramón Rosa =

Honduran lawyer, politician and writer (1848–1893)

Ramón Rosa Soto
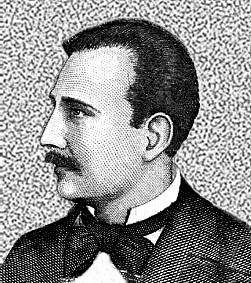
- Grabado de Ramón Rosa

Lieutenant Secretary of Finance of Guatemala
- In office 1871–1873
- President: Miguel Garcia Granados

Secretary of Education of Guatemala Secretary of Foreign Affairs of Guatemala (Note: Two in a box with his cousin, Dr. Marco Aurelio Soto.)
- In office 1873–1876
- President: Gral. Justo Rufino Barrios

Secretary General of Honduras
- In office 1876–1883
- President: Dr. Marco Aurelio Soto

Personal details
- Born: Ramón Rosa Soto; 14 July 1848 Tegucigalpa, Honduras
- Died: 28 May 1893 (aged 44) Tegucigalpa
- Party: Liberal
- Education: Universidad Nacional de Guatemala

Ramón Rosa Soto (15 July 1848 – 28 May 1893) was a lawyer, journalist, politician and liberal writer of the second half of the nineteenth century. He was the ideologue of educational changes of Liberal Reform in Guatemala and then in Honduras. He served as Principal Minister during the rule of his cousin, Dr. Marco Aurelio Soto and was associated with Soto's mining investments.

== Biography ==
Ramón Rosa, was the son of Juan José Soto and Isidora Rosa. He learned his first letters with a famous teacher in Honduras, who he later portrayed as the central character in his book The Scholastic teacher. He graduated BA in philosophy at the National University of Tegucigalpa and then attended college of law at the Faculty of Law and Notary of the National University of Guatemala where he was a classmate of his would-be inseparable cousin, Marco Aurelio Soto and the future archbishop of Guatemala, Ricardo Estrada Casanova . In this institution he studied with historian and diplomat Jose Milla and Vidaurre and former President of Colombia Dr. Mariano Espina, who had arrived to Guatemala in exile. He graduated in October 1871, at the age of 23. Shortly before, he had joined the Liberal Party in this country and had attacked the Conservative government of Marshal Vicente Cerna with articles in the newspaper El Central, which he co-founded. When the Liberal Reform triumphed in Guatemala, in June of that year, El Central supported the candidacy of General Miguel Garcia Granados in the plebiscite that was convened to elect a president between García Granados and Justo Rufino Barrios, the other liberal caudillo.

During the government of García Granados he served as deputy director of Finance and then the Ministry of Education in the government of Justo Rufino Barrios . During this government, was in charge of educational renewal in Guatemala, using the following liberal principles of government:

- Definitive separation of Church and State
- Deleting mandatory tithes
- Extinction of the brotherhoods
- Establishment of civil marriage
- secularization of cemeteries
- Creation of civil registration
- Establishment of secular education in all schools of the republic
- Instituting free primary school
- Reorganization of the university, to remove theology courses.

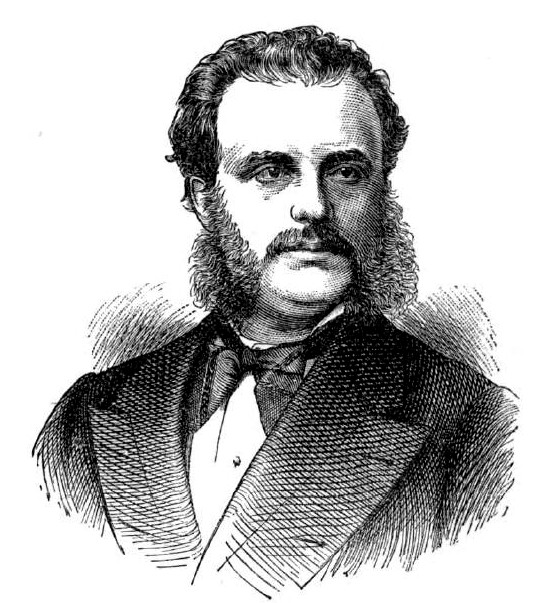
Marco Aurelio Soto

The office of Education was in the hands of Honduran intellectuals Rosa and Marco Aurelio Soto, who alternated their functions between it and the office of Foreign Affairs. The thought of both, strongly anticlerical, liberal intellectuals was reflected in liberal reforms education and religion in Guatemala, is summarized in these writings by Rosa in 1882: "In America, where popular instruction is spreading with the speed of light, and where it does not exist, as in Europe, deeply rooted and traditional religious interests, giving power and privilege to certain social classes; in our America, where freedom of conscience is already a definitive conquest: all, all the great religions have to disappear, at no distant day, with its artificial and contradictory dogmas, their liturgical theatrical devices, with their bloody histories, with their selfish and worldly interests badly disguised, with their hypocritical sanctities, and their privileged castes, and their execrable tyranny [...] ".

The government of Justo Rufino Barrios gradually was taking a dictatorial tone, and began to interfere in the politics of neighboring states to achieve the Central American Union. After a political ploy succeeded in overthrowing the government of Honduras, Barrios enthroned Marco Aurelio Soto and Ramón Rosa in the government of Honduras. Both left their ministries in Guatemala and landed in Amapala in 1876, inaugurating the provisional government, in which Rosa served as secretary general from 1876 to 1893. Rosa was also a business partner of mine and baking firms in Honduras. Ramón Rosa had married Mature in Guatemala.

== Marco Aurelio Soto Presidency ==
In 1876 the Conservative government of José María Medina in Honduras was crumbling, especially with the scandal of loans for the construction of Rail transport in Honduras and the disappearance of political and representatives of Honduras abroad. Honduran liberal requested changes in public administration of the State. Guatemalan President, seeing here the opportunity to establish a liberal and related to their interests in Honduras Central Union regime, led to the arrival of Marco Aurelio Soto as president, along with his cousin, Ramón Rosa.

In early 1876, following elections in El Salvador where Andrés del Valle was elected, Barrios met with him in El Chingo, which agreed to support the invasion of Honduras to install Marco Aurelio Soto, who had previously served as Minister Foreign and Education in Guatemala along with Rosa. Barrios and Valle pledged to give a thousand men for the cause, but political events were precipitated against Valle, due to mistrust of Barrios for the permanence in the government of Marshal Gonzalez, who was serving as vice president after being President before Valle.

Alleging that El Salvador had invaded Guatemala, diplomatic relations were broken; actions kicked off on 1 April. 1876, by a naval blockade by the steamer "The General Barrios". Subsequently, the ground invasion entered from the east where the Guatemalan General Gregorio Solares Pasaquina defeated the Salvadoran army, taking control of San Miguel and La Union; on the western front, after several clashes during Holy Week, the Guatemalan Army weakened the Salvadoran forces under Marshal González. Finding himself in this situation, Marshal Santiago González sent President Valle and E. Jacinto Mejia Castellanos to negotiate with Barrios, who reached a peace agreement in Chalchuapa on 25 April, on condition that Valle left office and González the army leadership, leaving the streets of Santa Ana and San Salvador to Guatemalan forces. As one of the commitments made in Chalchuapa, Valle before leaving the presidency convened a Board of Notables Santa Ana to ratify the agreement of 25 April to elect who would assume the presidency, provided Barrios approved the candidates. At such meeting in Santa Ana gathered around two hundred Salvadoran coffee landowners, merchants, politicians, military and lawyers, who according to Barrios elected as president Dr. Rafael Zaldívar.

Soto entered Honduras with the help of Barrios and was proclaimed as the Twentieth President of Honduras for the period from 1876 to 1880. His ideologue and Minister General was Ramon Rosa, who undertake an arduous task of transforming the nation of Honduras following the liberal precepts that had already been used in Guatemala. The transformation was based on the same principles as used Barrios Guatemala; administrative and legal reorganization of Honduras was hand-in-hand with increasing openness to foreign capital, especially that of the United States; President Soto -already owner of a substantial fortune- founded the "Rosario Mining Company" with the New York businessman S. Valentine in December 1879.

Rosa gave the law and the education system the imprint of positivist philosophy, which was reflected in the Code of Public Instruction (1882). He tried to attract foreign investment in mining and agriculture, after the project of developing a national scale coffee economy not bear fruit.

== Exile and death ==
When Soto was forced to resign as president in May 1883 by the pressure of Guatemalan troops that his former ally General Justo Rufino Barrios sent to the border, Rosa Soto went to Costa Rica and Guatemala . He was in Alajuela, Costa Rica between 1885 and 1886, and did not return to Honduras until 1889, continuing his journalistic work with the founding of the journal Guacerique. Rosa also proposed the organization of the Progressive Party in the general election of Honduras in 1891, although the party was dissolved shortly after. Then began a period of political instability in Honduras, led by Dr. Policarpo Bonilla, who later founded the Liberal Party of Honduras.

== Works published ==
According to Medardo Mejia, Ramón Rosa was who penetrated more strongly in the bowels of the Honduran reality, and to this day his dignity and style of his thinking are unsurpassed. He had faith in the steady progress and the value of institutions as well.

Ramón Rosa excelled in the genre of the essay and biography:

- Social Constitution in Honduras
- General Considerations on the Independence of Central America
- The Political Parties
- Keynote Speech at the Central University of Honduras
- Awareness of the Past

Examples of biographies:

- Biography of Don Jose Milla and Vidaurre
- Biography of Father Reyes, Tegucigalpa, 1965
- Wise Biography José Cecilio del Valle, Tegucigalpa, 1965
- History of Meritorious General Don Francisco Morazan, Tegucigalpa 1971.

According to Rafael Heliodoro Valle, both Rosa and Soto were the statesman who led the material and intellectual transformation of Honduras from 1876 to 1883. Rosa believed in freedom in terms of progress. He stated that "Rosa was above all a scholar, a speaker who was using the rostrum and desk he used the press to disseminate ideas and credentialing of his vocation as a thinker".

== Posthumous recognition ==
His effigy is shown on the 500 Lempiras bill.

== See also ==
- Justo Rufino Barrios
- Marco Aurelio Soto
- Miguel García Granados

== Bibliography ==
- Argueta, Martha Reina (1986). Biografía intelectual de Ramón Rosa (in Spanish). Tegucigalpa, Honduras: Guaymuras.
- Barrientos, Alfonso Enrique (1948). "Ramón Rosa y Guatemala" (PDF). Revista del archivo y biblioteca nacionales (in Spanish). 27 (3–4). Honduras.
- Cardenal, Rodolfo (1980). El poder eclesiástico en El Salvador, 1871–1931 (in Spanish). El Salvador: CONCULTURA.
- Lozano, Enrique (December 1890). "Drama Político en Honduras". La Opinión (in Spanish). México D.F.: 56.
- Molina Jiménez (2001). "La Polémica de "El problema (1899)", de Máximo Soto Hall". Revista Mexicana del Caribe (in Spanish). VI (12). Red de Revistas Científicas de América Latina, el Caribe, España y Portugal;Sistema de Información Científica.
- Oyuela, Leticia de (2007). Ramón Rosa, plenitudes y desengaños (in Spanish). Tegucigalpa, Honduras: Guaymuras. ISBN 978-99926-33--67-0.
- Palma, José Joaquín (1882). Ramón Rosa (ed.). Poesías (in Spanish). Tegucigalpa, Honduras: Tipografía Nacional.
- Rosa, Marco Antonio (1976). Ramón Rosa, fictionalized biography (in Spanish). Honduras: Editora Industrial.
- Suazo Rubí, Sergio (1991). Auge y crisis ideológica del Partido Liberal 100 años (in Spanish). Tegucigalpa, Honduras: Alin Editora.
