= Bonilla =

Bonilla is a surname of Spanish origin. It may refer to:

- Alejandro Bonilla (1820–1901), Dominican painter and teacher
- Andrea Bonilla (born 1978), Bolivian politician
- Andrea Bonilla (runner) (born 1986), Ecuadorian long-distance runner
- Armando Bonilla (born 1967), American attorney who is a Judge of the U.S. Court of Federal Claims
- Arturo Bonilla (born 1953), Honduran footballer
- Bobby Bonilla (born 1963), American baseball player who played from 1986 to 2001 in Major League Baseball
- Breyner Bonilla (born 1986), Colombian footballer
- Byron Bonilla (born 1993), Nicaraguan footballer
- Charles F. Bonilla (1909–1987), American chemist
- Cristian Bonilla (born 1993), Colombian footballer
- Daryl Bonilla (born 1975), Hawaiian actor, comedian, and professional wrestler.
- E. J. Bonilla (born 1988), American actor
- Fernando Bonilla (born 1962), Puerto Rican politician who served as Secretary of State of the Commonwealth of Puerto Rico
- Gerardo Bonilla – Professional race car driver.
- Gilbert Bonilla, American musician and member of Beatles tribute bands The Fab Four and founder of Hard Day's Night band
- Giselle Bonilla (born 1994), American actress.
- Héctor Bonilla (1939–2022), Mexican actor
- Henry Bonilla – Former Congressman who represented Texas's 23rd congressional district in the U.S. House of Representatives.
- Hugo Orellana Bonilla – Peruvian painter.
- Jaime Bonilla Valdez (born 1950), Mexican politician and entrepreneur who served as Governor of Baja California from 2019 to 2021
- Jaime Antonio “Jimmy” Bonilla Santiago, Puerto Rican Salsa and Tropical Music Singer. Professor and Retired US Army.
- Javi Bonilla (born 1990), Spanish footballer
- Jesús Bonilla (born 1955), Spanish actor
- Joaquín Díaz Bonilla (born 1989), Argentine rugby union player
- José Bonilla, Mexican astronomer who in 1883 took the earliest known photograph of an unidentified flying object, the Bonilla Observation
- Jose Bonilla (boxer) (1967–2002), Venezuelan boxer and former world champion
- José Eulogio Bonilla (born 1946), Mexican politician, senator
- José María Bonilla (1889–1957), Guatemalan writer
- José Santiago de Bonilla y Laya-Bolívar (1756–1824), Costa Rican politician
- Juan Bonilla (baseball) (born 1955), Puerto Rican baseball player
- Juan Bonilla (bishop) (1636–1696), bishop of Ariano, 1689–96
- Juan Bonilla (writer) (born 1966), Spanish writer
- Juan Crisóstomo Bonilla (1835–1884), Mexican general
- Juan José de Bonilla y Herdocia (1790–1847), Costa Rican politician
- Leonor Bonilla (born 1970), Mexican actress
- Leydy Bonilla – Dominican singer
- Lisalverto Bonilla – Dominican baseball pitcher
- Manuel Bonilla – President of Honduras from 1903 to 1907 and from 1912 to 1913
- Manuel Bonilla Elhart – Peruvian war hero
  - Manuel Bonilla Sports Complex
- Marc Bonilla (born 1955), American guitarist.
- Nelson Bonilla (born 1990), Salvadoran footballer
- Olivia Bonilla (born 1992), American singer-songwriter and musician
- Óscar Bonilla (born 1978), Honduran footballer
- Pablo Bonilla (born 1999), Venezuelan footballer
- Policarpo Bonilla (1858–1926), President of Honduras from 1894 to 1899.
- Socorro Bonilla (born 1947), Mexican actress
- Susan Bonilla (born 1960), American politician who served in the California State Assembly
- Víctor Bonilla (born 1971), Colombian footballer
- Yarimar Bonilla (born 1975), Puerto Rican political anthropologist

== See also ==
- Ignacio Bonillas – Mexican diplomat and former Mexican ambassador of the United States of America.
- Iñaki Bonillas – Mexican artist.
- Alfonso Bonilla Aragón International Airport – Airport in Cali, Colombia.
- Bonilla, South Dakota
- Juan C. Bonilla (municipality), a municipality in Puebla, Mexico
- Lake Bonilla, Costa Rica
