= Jose Bonilla =

Jose Bonilla can refer to:

- Juan José de Bonilla y Herdocia (1790–1847), Costa Rican politician
- José Santiago de Bonilla y Laya-Bolívar (1756–1824), Costa Rican politician
- José Bonilla (astronomer) (1853–1920), Mexican astronomer responsible for the 1883 Bonilla observation
- José María Bonilla (1889–1957), Guatemalan writer
- José Eulogio Bonilla (born 1946), Mexican politician, senator
- José Bonilla (boxer) (1967–2002), Venezuelan boxer
