= Juan Bonilla =

Juan Bonilla may refer to:

- Juan Bonilla (baseball) (born 1955), Puerto Rican baseball player
- Juan Bonilla (bishop) (1636–1696), bishop of Ariano, 1689–96
- Juan Bonilla (soldier) (fl. 1860s), Dominican Republic revolutionary
- Juan Bonilla (writer) (born 1966), Spanish writer
- Juan Crisóstomo Bonilla (1835–1884), Mexican general
- Juan C. Bonilla (municipality), a municipality in Puebla, Mexico
