= Jessica Krug =

American historian (born 1982)

- Born: c. 1982 (age 43–44)
- Other names: Jess "La Bombalera"; Jessica Cruz
- Education: University of Kansas (attended); Portland State University (BA); University of Wisconsin, Madison (MA, PhD)
- Awards: Fulbright-Hays Doctoral Dissertation Research Abroad Fellowship (2009)

Jessica Anne Krug (born c. 1982) is an American historian, author, and activist. Krug taught at George Washington University (GWU) from 2012 to 2020, eventually becoming a tenured associate professor of history there. Her publications include Fugitive Modernities: Kisama and the Politics of Freedom, a history of the Kisama region in Angola; the book was a finalist for the Frederick Douglass Prize and the Harriet Tubman Prize.

In September 2020, Krug admitted that she had misrepresented her race and ethnicity during her career by pretending to be Black and Latina when she is actually a white Jewish woman. Shortly thereafter, she resigned from her position at GWU at the request of the university's history department.

== Early and personal life ==
Jessica Anne Krug—who pronounces her surname Cruz (/kruːz/ or /kruːs/, kruuz or kruus in General American) in imitation of the Spanish surname—was raised in a Jewish family in Overland Park, Kansas. She attended Hyman Brand Hebrew Academy and The Barstow School a co-ed private college prep school in south Kansas City. She later attended the University of Kansas before transferring to Portland State University, where she earned a bachelor's degree in 2005. In 2009, she was awarded a $45,000 Fulbright-Hays Doctoral Dissertation Research Abroad Fellowship. In 2012, Krug earned a Ph.D. from the University of Wisconsin–Madison, "one of the nation's most prestigious African history programs". Her doctoral adviser was James Sweet.

Krug has stated that she lives with unaddressed mental health issues, and that she began to present herself as a light-skinned person of color as a juvenile to escape from trauma and emotional difficulties.

== Career ==
Krug began teaching history at George Washington University in 2012. She gained tenure in 2018. As of 2020, she was an associate professor. Krug has authored articles and a book relating to African American history and Latin America. She has published essays in Essence and at the race-exploring website RaceBaitR. Krug received financial support from the Schomburg Center for Research in Black Culture, leading to the publication of her book Fugitive Modernities: Kisama and the Politics of Freedom.

=== Fugitive Modernities ===
Krug is the author of Fugitive Modernities: Kisama and the Politics of Freedom. The book is about the Quiçama people in Angola and in other places, especially Brazil. The book was a finalist for the Frederick Douglass Prize and the Harriet Tubman Prize. In Fugitive Modernities, Krug engages in a "rigorous examination of identity formation" of Kisama, a mountainous region in Angola that became a destination for those fleeing the slave trade in the late 16th century. Krug's book was the first history of the Kisama region. She argued that "Kisama allows us to imagine a more humane and less brutalized form of interpersonal relationship in which the structures erected by states to constrain us are overcome in favor of shared liberation."

=== Racial identity controversy ===
Krug has offered various narratives concerning her race and ethnicity. She has said that she is half Algerian-American and half German-American. She has also said that she is a Bronx-bred Afroboricua and has used the name "Jess La Bombalera", "bombalera" being a faux-Spanish construction of her own which is meant to reference bomba music; the correct term for a female bomba enthusiast is bombera. At GWU, Krug told her colleagues that she was Afro-Latina and that she had been raised in the Bronx by an abusive, drug-addicted Puerto Rican mother. In her classes, she occasionally used Spanglish and spoke of her Puerto Rican heritage.

A junior scholar noticed that Krug's stated race/ethnicity had changed from part-Algerian–part-German to Afro–Puerto Rican. Word of this discrepancy reached Professor Yomaira C. Figueroa-Vásquez of Michigan State University, who, upon researching the matter, discovered that Krug came from the Kansas City area and had Jewish parents.

In a September 3, 2020, blog post, Krug said: "I have eschewed my lived experience as a White Jewish child in suburban Kansas City under various assumed identities within a Blackness that I had no right to claim: first North African Blackness, then US rooted Blackness, then Caribbean rooted Bronx Blackness." Krug's disclosure drew international media attention. Her September 3 blog post went viral. By the close of that day, "a now-infamous video of Krug calling herself 'Jess La Bombalera' and speaking in a D-list imitation Bronx accent was all over the internet".

Hari Ziyad, the editor of RaceBaitr, said Krug had only come forward with the revelation of her racial deceptions because they had been discovered and were about to be made public against her wishes. Similarly, Figueroa-Vásquez asserted that pending public revelations of Krug's true racial identity prompted her confession. Figueroa, believing that Krug "took up some of the very few—very few—resources and spaces that there are available to Black and Latino scholars" and used them to advance herself, called for "a form of restitution for the things that she [Krug] took. It's egregious." Figueroa and Hunter College's Yarimar Bonilla called Krug's various cultural appropriations a form of minstrelsy. Figueroa also noted that Krug had falsely claimed that her parents had been drug addicts and her mother a sex worker; Figueroa described Krug's actions as "preying on the white imagination, and pulling from some of the worst stereotypes that there are about black people and Puerto Rican people, and using that as a cloak for her identity". Describing Krug as a "minstrel act", Illinois State University's Touré F. Reed asserted that Krug did not appropriate legitimate black culture but rather its "racist caricature".

Duke University Press, the publisher of Krug's Fugitive Modernities, said that all proceeds from her book will be donated to a fund that will assist black and Latino scholars.

=== Resignation ===
Following Krug's disclosure of her misrepresentation, the George Washington University History Department asked her to resign her tenured professorship, stating: "With her conduct, Dr. Krug has raised questions about the veracity of her own research and teaching". GWU cancelled Krug's classes after the scandal broke. On September 9, 2020, GWU confirmed that Krug had resigned from the university.

== See also ==
- List of impostors
- H. G. Carrillo (Herman Glenn Carroll), another professor at the George Washington University who falsely claimed a Latino identity
