= USS Princeton (PG-13) =

Gunboat of the United States Navy

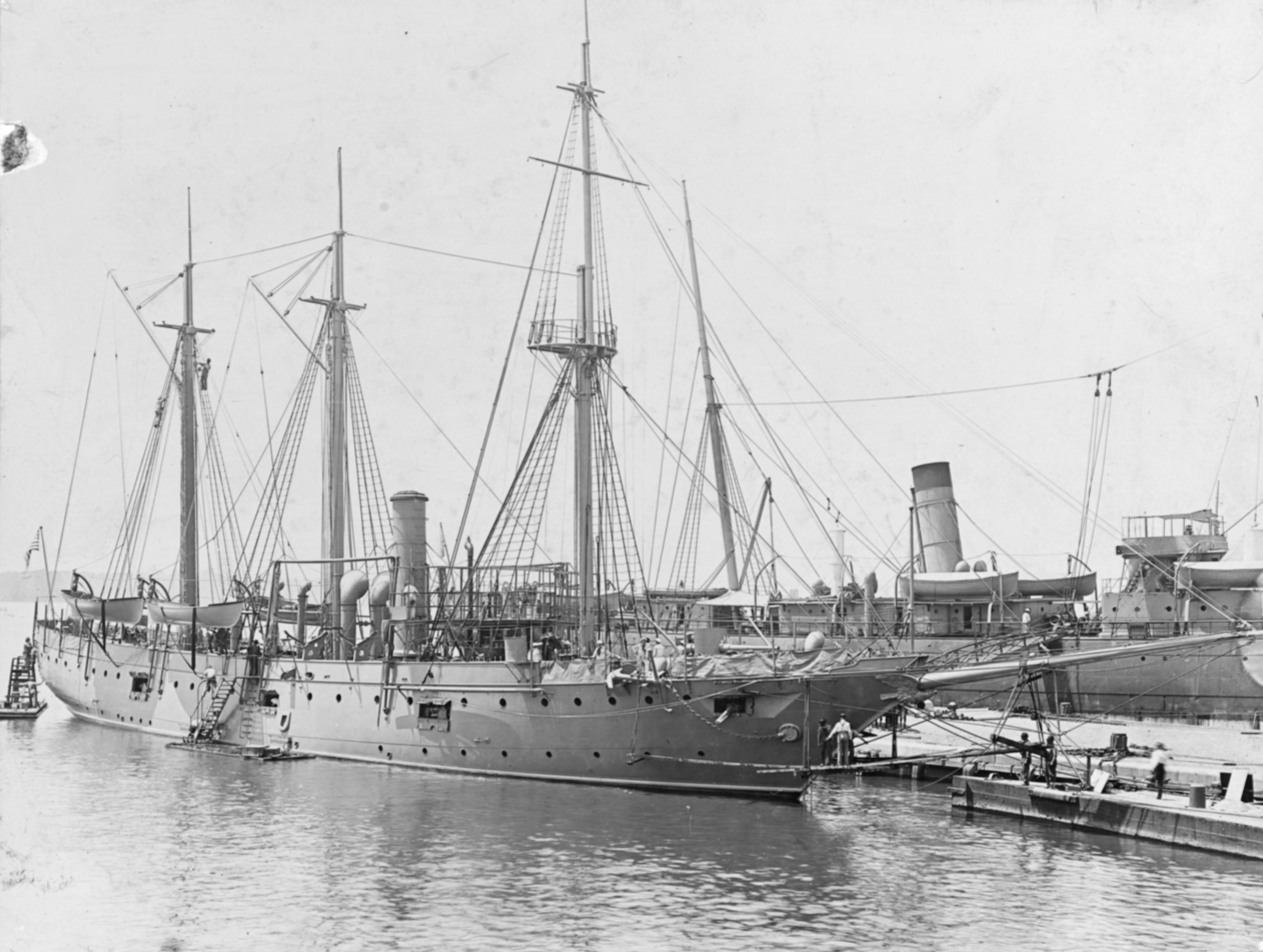
- USS Princeton in 1898

History

United States
- Name: USS Princeton
- Builder: J. H. Dialogue and Son, Camden, New Jersey
- Laid down: May 1896
- Launched: 3 June 1897
- Commissioned: 27 May 1898
- Decommissioned: 12 June 1903
- Recommissioned: 12 May 1905
- Decommissioned: 3 July 1907
- Recommissioned: 5 November 1909
- Decommissioned: 18 September 1915
- Recommissioned: 16 January 1918
- Decommissioned: 25 April 1919
- Stricken: 23 June 1919
- Fate: Sold, 13 November 1919

General characteristics
- Type: Gunboat
- Displacement: 1,103 long tons (1,121 t)
- Length: 168 ft (51 m)
- Beam: 36 ft (11 m)
- Draft: 12 ft 9 in (3.89 m)
- Speed: 11 knots (20 km/h; 13 mph)
- Complement: 147
- Armament: 2 × 1-pounder guns; 1 × machine gun

The third USS Princeton was a composite gunboat in the United States Navy.

Princeton was laid down in May 1896 by J. H. Dialogue and Son, Camden, New Jersey; launched on 3 June 1897; sponsored by Miss Margeretta Updike; and commissioned on 27 May 1898 at Philadelphia, Pennsylvania.

== Service history ==
=== Spanish–American War, 1898–1899 ===
After acceptance trials on 7–25 July 1898 off Delaware Bay, Princeton got underway for Key West where she joined the North Atlantic Fleet on 27 July at the beginning of the Spanish–American War. She was immediately sent (on 2 August) to patrol the area from the northern tip of the Yucatán Peninsula to Livingston, Guatemala. After completing this mission on 13 August, she returned to Key West and the Dry Tortugas and remained on this station until departing on 11 January 1899 for New York City.

=== Asiatic Fleet, 1899–1903 ===
Princeton sailed for the Pacific in early 1899 She passed through the Straits of Gibraltar on 2 February and the Suez Canal from 13 to 17 February, joining the Asiatic Fleet on 16 April at Cavite, Philippines. Princeton cruised throughout the Philippines from 4 to 15 May with the gunboat Petrel, distributing the proclamation of peace with Spain. Later, she carried Senator Albert J. Beveridge on a tour of the newly acquired Philippine Territory.

USS Princeton in Manila Bay, about 1903

In late May, Princeton commenced blockading the Lingayen Gulf ports of St. Vincent and Musa and extended the blockade to the entire Gulf from 18 to 26 June. During the various local disturbances on Luzon, she landed troops at San Fabian on 2–7 November, transported cavalrymen from Vigan to Lingayen, conveyed dispatches, received surrendered arms and carried stores to the Marines at Subic Bay. She met the expedition led by Col. Luther Hare and Col. Robert Howze on 2 Jan. 1900 at Abulug, which rescued American prisoners, including Lt. Gillmore's men from the Siege of Baler. Princeton took formal possession of the Babuyan and the Batan Islands on 10–13 January 1900 and continued to patrol off Luzon on 10 February. Princeton was later station ship at Iloilo and Cebu from 5 March until 21 June.

At the time of the Boxer Rebellion, Princeton cruised in Chinese waters (26 June–29 November) between Hong Kong and Woosung where she received a draft of men from the auxiliary cruiser Buffalo on 9 August.

She returned on 4 December to operations in the Philippine–American War, principally in the Sulu Archipelago, and remained on duty there until 20 July 1902. Princeton was stationed at Cavite beginning 23 July and called at Uraga, Japan (9 October–18 December). She rescued the crew of the disabled schooner Otelia Pedersen (United States) on 6 October off Formosa. While at Cavite, she participated in large-scale maneuvers off the Philippines (29 December–3 February 1903). Afterwards, Princeton acted as a survey ship (13 February–5 April) at Malabug Bay, Zamboanga and Dumanquilas Bay until she departed on 13 April for California. Princeton decommissioned on 12 June 1903 at Mare Island Navy Yard.

=== Pacific Squadron, 1905–1907 ===
Princeton recommissioned on 12 May 1905 at Mare Island Navy Yard and was attached to the Pacific Squadron. She left on 4 June for duty as station ship at Panama City, where she remained until 24 October. On 2 December 1905, Princeton returned to Mare Island Navy Yard and began cruising off the Pacific coast from San Diego, California to Esquimalt, British Columbia. She escorted Rear Admiral C. J. Train's remains from Vancouver to Seattle (22–24 August), assisted the protected cruiser Boston (6–9 December) which was aground off Bellingham, Washington, and accompanied the armored cruiser California on her sea trials off Washington from 10 to 22 September. On 7 November 1906 she was in a minor collision when struck by James Nesmith, under tow by the tugs Wyadda and Dolphin, receiving minor damage at Port Townsend, Washington. Princeton remained on station off the West coast until directed to rejoin the Pacific Squadron on 3 January 1907 at Magdalena Bay, Mexico.

Princeton proceeded to Corinto, Nicaragua, arriving 17 March for the purpose of protecting American interests there. She transported troops from Ampala, Honduras, to La Unión, (12 April) and brought General Bonilla back to Salina Cruz, Mexico (13 April). She returned to San Diego on 30 May and decommissioned on 3 July 1907 at Bremerton, Washington.

=== Nicaraguan Expedition, 1909–1911 ===
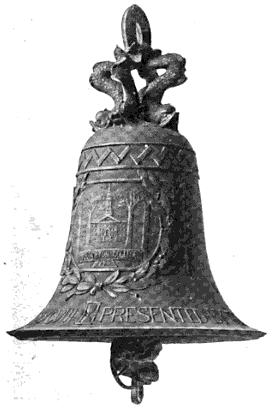
A bell presented to USS Princeton by the alumni of Princeton University in December 1898.

Princeton recommissioned on 5 November 1909 at Bremerton and sailed on 28 November for Central America for duty with the Nicaraguan Expeditionary Squadron. From 20 December until 21 March 1911 she showed the flag in this area, operating between San Juan del Sur, Nicaragua, and La Unión, El Salvador. She returned to Puget Sound Navy Yard 20 June 1911 for repairs and alterations.

=== 1911–1919 ===
From late 1911 until 1915 she was used as a station ship at Tutuila, American Samoa. Returning to San Francisco on 18 September 1915, Princeton decommissioned and was laid up until 20 February 1917 when she proceeded to Puget Sound for repairs. She commissioned in ordinary there on 16 January 1918 for use as a training ship at Seattle from 9 May 1918 to 25 April 1919 when she decommissioned. Princeton was struck from the Navy List on 23 June 1919 and sold to Farrell, Kane and Stratton, Seattle, Washington, on 13 November 1919.
