= National anthem of Guatemala =

Himno Nacional de Guatemala
English: National anthem of Guatemala
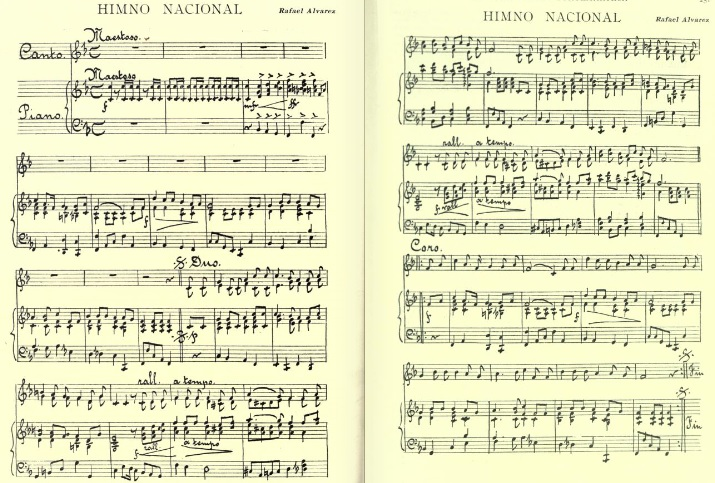
- National anthem of Guatemala
- Lyrics: José Joaquín Palma and José María Bonilla Ruano, 1896 (modified in July 1934 by the latter)
- Music: Rafael Álvarez Ovalle, 1896
- Adopted: 19 February 1897

Audio sample
- file; help

The National Anthem of Guatemala (Spanish: Himno Nacional de Guatemala) (Note: The anthem is often erroneously titled Guatemala Feliz!, from its opening lyrics, but it has no official name and is only referred to in the country as Himno Nacional) was an initiative of the government of General José María Reina Barrios. (Note: President Manuel Lisandro Barillas had previously selected a different anthem a decade earlier but it was considered defective by President Reyna and replaced.) Its music was composed by Rafael Álvarez Ovalle and its original lyrics written by Cuban poet and diplomat José Joaquín Palma, in the context of the cultural and industrial event Exposición Centroamericana of 1897.

The anthem was particularly warmongering and reflected the Cuban War of Independence more than the independence of Central America. (Note: José Joaquín Palma had actively participated in the Cuban independence effort.) Due to this, by a 1934 order of President Jorge Ubico some changes to the lyrics were made by pedagogue José María Bonilla Ruano.

The lyrics and score were printed for the first time in the culture magazine La Ilustración Guatemalteca, where the original author of the lyrics appeared as "Anonymous". It was not until 1910, shortly before his death, that Palma confessed being the author.

== History ==
=== Origins ===
In 1879, the El Porvenir Literary Society unsuccessfully attempted to create a national anthem for Guatemala. In 1887, the president of Guatemala, General Manuel Lisandro Barillas Bercián, called for a competition to choose music that would complement the lyrics of the "National Anthem" written by poet Ramón P. Molina. Distinguished composers took part in this competition, and the triumph was awarded to music presented by Rafael Álvarez Ovalle.

=== Competition organized by Reina Barrios ===
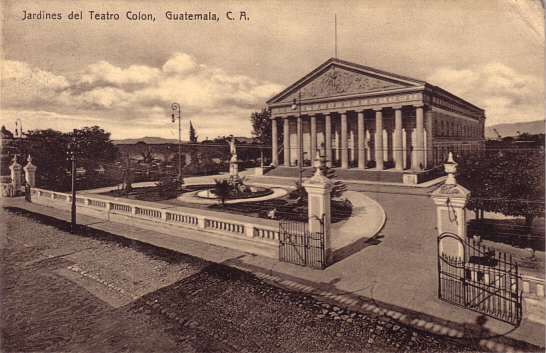
Colón Theatre after its remodelling in 1892. The National Anthem of Guatemala was premiered here on 14 March 1897.

In 1896, the government of General José María Reina Barrios called for a new competition, "considering that Guatemala lacks a National Anthem, since the one known to this day by that name not only suffers from notable defects, but also has not been officially declared as such; and that it is convenient to provide the country with an anthem that, through its lyrics and music, responds to the lofty purposes for which all educated people lend this kind of composition." In this new competition, Rafael Álvarez Ovalle's work was chosen again, this time musicalising a poem written under the pseudonym "Anonymous".

The victory granted again to the teacher Álvarez Ovalle cost him the most bitter moments of his existence, as there was discontent among those who did not win, who even sent their complaint to the president. Reina Barrios, in the presence of the members of his cabinet, other figures and teachers of musical art, listened again to all the compositions that competed in the competition, and Álvarez Ovalle's was unanimously selected again.

With respect to the lyrics, the qualifying jury determined the following:

"Guatemala, 27 October 1896. Mr. Minister of Public Instruction. Present.

In compliance with the honorable commission with which you favored us, taking charge of the qualification of the 'national anthems' presented to this secretariat, by virtue of the competition opened by the agreement of the 24th of last July, we have examined the twelve compositions that with such objective you were kind enough to send us on the 15th of the current. Encouraged by best wishes, and with a view to making the appointment required by the aforementioned agreement, we have met several times, and after a long and careful examination, we have the honor to inform you that, in our opinion, the anthem that begins with the words Guatemala feliz and carries at the bottom the lyrics of 'Anonymous' in parentheses is the one that best responds to the conditions of the call and deserves, therefore, the prize offered. Thus we have the honor of issuing the report that the secretariat of your worthy position requested of us, writing to us with all consideration and appreciation, the minister, very attentive and reliable servants.

José Leonard, J. J. Palma, F. Castañeda."

— Text of the report submitted by the qualifying jury of the literary competition, made up of F. Castañeda, J. Joaquín Palma and José Leonard.

As can be seen, Cuban poet José Joaquín Palma was a member of the qualifying jury.

Palma's lyrics were officially adopted on 28 October 1896, while Álvarez Ovalle's music was officially adopted on 19 February 1897. The premiere of the National Anthem took place in the literary lyrical act held at the Colón Theatre on the night of Sunday, 14 March 1897, as one of the main points of the programme of celebrations of the Exposición Centroamericana, with Álvarez Ovalle being decorated with a medal of gold and diploma of honor.

=== Palma confesses to being the author ===
The author of the lyrics of the National Anthem of Guatemala remained a deep mystery until 1910, when it was discovered that its author was Cuban poet José Joaquín Palma, since he revealed on his deathbed that he was the author of the lyrics of the anthem. The government of Manuel Estrada Cabrera awarded both him and Rafael Álvarez Ovalle with gold laurel wreaths at the Fiestas Minervalias that year.

== Lyrics ==
=== Original lyrics (1897–1934) ===
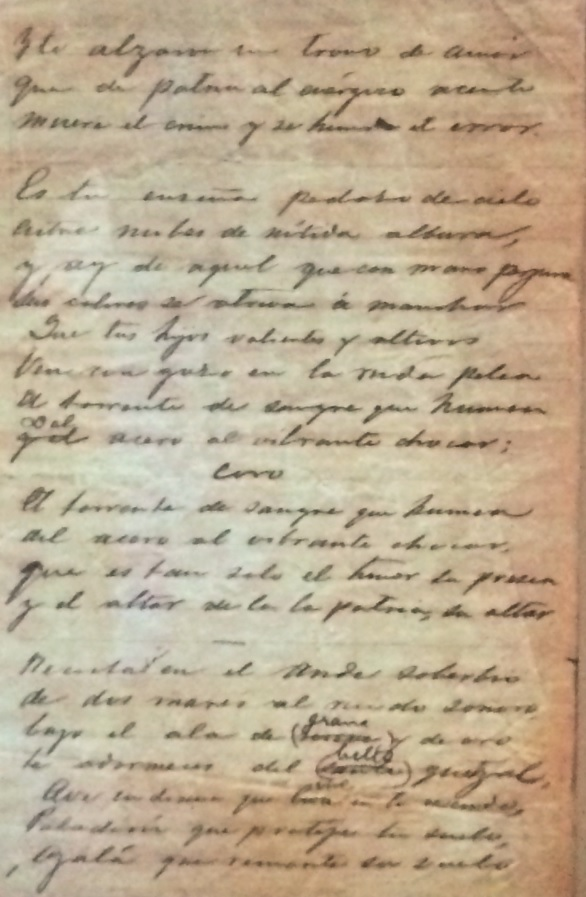
Facsimile of the original lyrics by J.J. Palma with verses from the National Anthem, written in 1897. National History Museum of Guatemala.

Band and male vocal performance from 1900

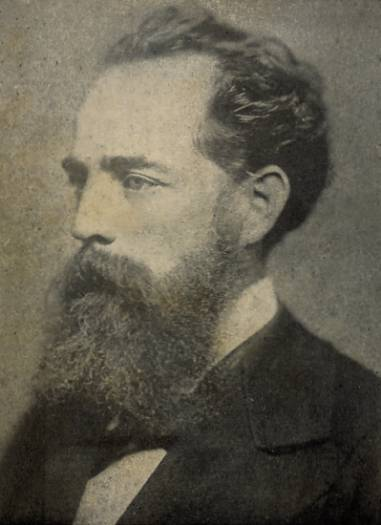
Cuban poet and hero José Joaquín Palma, author of the original lyrics of the anthem

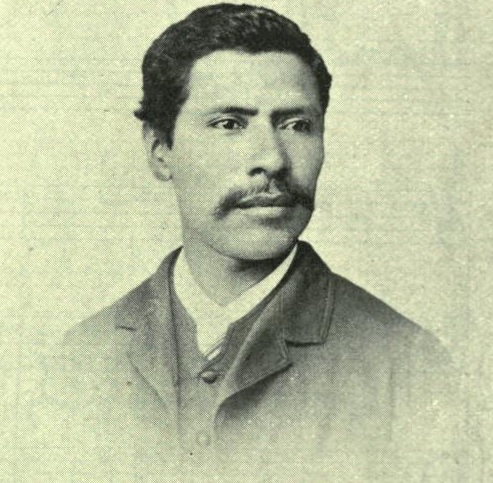
Guatemalan composer Rafael Álvarez Ovalle, composer of the music of the anthem. Photo from La Ilustración Guatemalteca, 1897.

The original lyrics of the Guatemalan anthem written by José Joaquín Palma were warlike, since Palma was inspired more by the political situation his native Cuba was going through than that Guatemala experienced during its independence: while Central America separated from Spanish Empire peacefully, Cuba was waging a fierce war against Spain at the time Palma wrote the anthem.

Spanish original

I
¡Guatemala feliz…! ya tus aras
No sangrienta feroz el verdugo,
No hay cobardes que laman el yugo (Note: The stanza corresponds more to the Cuban War of Independence than the situation by which Guatemala became independent from Spain. Palma lived in Guatemala after being exiled from Cuba for his participation in the independence movement, taking advantage of the fact that the government of Justo Rufino Barrios had recognised the independent government in exile in Cuba. Along with Palma, several distinguished Cubans settled in Guatemala, among them José Martí.)
Ni tiranos que escupan tu faz.

Si mañana tu suelo sagrado
Lo profana invasión extranjera
Tinta en sangre tu hermosa bandera
De mortaja al audaz servirá. (Note: Apparently, this stanza is based on the death of Cuban hero José Martí.)

Coro I:
Tinta en sangre tu hermosa bandera
De mortaja al audaz servirá,
Que tu pueblo con ánima fiera
Antes muerto que esclavo será.

II
De tus viejas y duras cadenas
Tu fundiste con mano iracunda
El arado que el suelo fecunda,
Y la espada que salva el honor.

Nuestros padres lucharon un día
Encendidos en patrio ardimiento,
Te arrancaron del potro sangriento
Y te alzaron un trono de amor.

Coro II:
Te arrancaron del potro sangriento
Y te alzaron un trono de amor.
Que de patria al enérgico acento
Muere el crimen y se hunde el error. (Note: This stanza is direct in its criticism of the Spanish administration in America.)

III
Es tu enseña pedazo de cielo
Entre nubes de nítida albura (Note: This stanza was modified to imply that the national flag was white, blue and white.)
Y ¡ay de aquel que con mano perjura
Sus colores se atreva a manchar!

Que tus hijos valientes y altivos
Ven con gozo en la ruda pelea
El torrente de sangre que humea
Del acero al vibrante chocar. (Note: Another reference to the situation in Cuba in 1897)

Coro III:
El torrente de sangre que humea
Del acero al vibrante chocar,
Que es tan sólo el honor su presea
Y el altar de la patria, su altar.

IV
Recostada en el ande soberbio
De dos mares al ruido sonoro
Bajo el ala de grana y de oro
Te adormeces del bello quetzal.

Ave indiana que vive en tu escudo,
Paladión que protege tu suelo
¡Ojalá que remonte su vuelo
Más que el cóndor y el águila real!

Coro IV:
¡Ojalá que remonte su vuelo
Más que el cóndor y el águila real,
Y en sus alas levante hasta el cielo,
Guatemala, tu nombre inmortal!

English translation

I
Merry Guatemala…! Your altars
The fierce executioner no longer bloodies,
There are no cowards who lick the yoke
Nor tyrants who spit on your face.

If tomorrow your sacred ground
Is profaned by foreign invasion
Stained in blood, your beautiful flag
Will serve as a shroud for the bold.

Chorus I:
Stained in blood, your beautiful flag
Will serve as a shroud for the bold,
May your people with fierce spirit
Be rather dead than a slave.

II
From your old and hard chains
You smelted with an angry hand
The plough that fertilizes the soil,
And the sword that saves honor.

Our fathers fought one day
Burning with national ardor,
They tore you from the bloody rack
And lifted you a throne of love.

Chorus II:
They tore you from the bloody rack
And lifted you a throne of love.
May from fatherland to the energetic focus
Crime die and error sink.

III
Your ensign is a piece of heaven
Between clouds of clear whiteness
And woe to he who perjures with hand
Dares to stain its colors!

May your brave and proud children
See with joy in the rough fight
The torrent of blood that emanates
From the steel to the vibrant clash.

Chorus III:
The torrent of blood that emanates
From the steel to the vibrant clash,
Which is only the honor of their medal
And the altar of the fatherland, their altar.

IV
Lying on the superb Andes
From two seas to the sonorous noise
Under the wing of scarlet and gold
You fall asleep to the beautiful quetzal.

Indian bird that lives on your coat of arms,
Palladium that protects your soil
May it take its flight
More than the condor and the golden eagle!

Chorus IV:
May it take its flight
More than the condor and the golden eagle,
And on its wings lift up to the sky,
Guatemala, your immortal name!

=== Current lyrics (1934–present) ===
Modern musical score

For not reflecting Guatemalan reality, Palma's lyrics were modified by Guatemalan poet and pedagogue José María Bonilla Ruano in 1934, according to the Government Decree of 26 July 1934 by the government of General Jorge Ubico Castañeda. These are the lyrics sung today.

Spanish original

I
¡Guatemala feliz! que tus aras
no profane jamás el verdugo;
ni haya esclavos que laman el yugo
ni tiranos que escupan tu faz.

Si mañana tu suelo sagrado
lo amenaza invasión extranjera,
libre al viento tu hermosa bandera
a vencer o a morir llamará.

Coro I:
Libre al viento tu hermosa bandera
a vencer o a morir llamará;
que tu pueblo con ánima fiera
antes muerto que esclavo será.

II
De tus viejas y duras cadenas
tú forjaste con mano iracunda,
el arado que el suelo fecunda
y la espada que salva el honor.

Nuestros padres lucharon un día
encendidos en patrio ardimiento,
y lograron sin choque sangriento
colocarte en un trono de amor.

Coro II:
Y lograron sin choque sangriento
colocarte en un trono de amor,
que de patria en enérgico acento
dieron vida al ideal redentor.

III
Es tu enseña pedazo de cielo
en que prende una nube su albura,
y ¡ay! de aquel que con ciega locura
sus colores pretenda manchar.

Pues tus hijos valientes y altivos,
que veneran la paz cual presea,
nunca esquivan la ruda pelea
si defienden su tierra y su hogar.

Coro III:
Nunca esquivan la ruda pelea
si defienden su tierra y su hogar,
que es tan sólo el honor su alma idea
y el altar de la patria su altar.

IV
Recostada en el ande soberbio,
de dos mares al ruido sonoro,
bajo el ala de grana y de oro
te adormeces del bello Quetzal.

Ave indiana que vive en tu escudo,
paladión que protege tu suelo;
¡ojalá que remonte su vuelo,
más que el cóndor y el águila real!

Coro IV:
¡Ojalá que remonte su vuelo,
más que el cóndor y el águila real!
y en sus alas levante hasta el cielo,
Guatemala, tu nombre inmortal.

English translation

I
Merry Guatemala! That your altars
Never be profaned by the tormentor,
Nor there be slaves who lick the yoke
Nor tyrants who spit on your face.

If tomorrow your sacred ground
Is threatened by foreign invasion
Free to the wind, your beautiful flag
To victory or death it will call.

Chorus I:
Free to the wind, your beautiful flag
To victory or death it will call;
That your people with fierce spirit
Rather dead than slave become.

II
From your old and hard chains
You forged with an angry hand
The plough that fertilizes the soil,
And the sword that saves honor.

Our fathers fought one day
Burning with patriotic fervor,
And managed without a bloody clash
To place you on a throne of love.

Chorus II:
And managed without a bloody clash
To place you on a throne of love,
Which from fatherland in energetic focus
Gave life to the redemptive ideal.

III
A piece of heaven your ensign is
In which a cloud enlightens its alabaster
And… woe to him who with blind madness
Its colors intends to stain!

Because your brave and proud children,
Who venerate peace as a prized gift,
Never dodge the rough fight
If they defend their land and their home.

Chorus III:
Never dodge the rough fight
If they defend their land and their home,
That honor is their guiding cry
And the altar of the fatherland their altar.

IV
Leaning on the proud alp
From two seas to the sonorous noise
Under the wing of scarlet and gold
You are dazzled by the beautiful quetzal.

Indian bird that lives in your shield,
Palladium that protects your land
May it take its flight
Higher than the condor and the golden eagle!

Chorus IV:
May it take its flight
Higher than the condor and the golden eagle,
And on its wings lift up to the sky,
Guatemala, your immortal name!

=== Certifications ===
The National Anthem of Guatemala has been considered by Carlos Labin, a member of the Americanist Society of Paris and the Musicology Society of France, as the "most original" of all the anthems of the American continent.
