= List of birds by flight speed =

List of bird flight speeds

This is a list of the average and fastest flight speeds achieved by birds. A bird's velocity is necessarily variable; a hunting bird will reach much greater speeds while diving to catch prey than when flying horizontally. The bird that can achieve the greatest speed is the peregrine falcon (Falco peregrinus), able to exceed 320 km/h (200 mph) in its dives. A close relative of the common swift, the white-throated needletail (Hirundapus caudacutus), is commonly reported as the fastest bird in level flight with a reported top speed of 169 km/h (105 mph). This record remains unconfirmed as the measurement methods have never been published or verified. The record for the fastest confirmed level flight by a bird is 111.5 km/h (69.3 mph) held by the common swift.

Anecdotal, unverifiable records are frequently reported for bird species. Moreover, providing single, comparable flight speeds across Aves is extremely difficult, if not impossible: the value of any given measurement is subject to variation from 1) measurement tools; 2) the influence of wind and climatic conditions at the time of measurement; 3) the bird's lift, drag, and body position; 4) variation in a species' flight behaviour at time of measurement (e.g., normal locomotion, escape, migration); and 5) whether the bird is flapping or gliding, among others.

Some values given for the horizontal speed of a bird are airspeed, or the velocity of its movement relative to the air (i.e., accounting for wind speed). Others are the bird's groundspeed, or the velocity of a bird relative to a fixed point on the ground. Birds riding a strong tailwind will have much higher groundspeeds than any airspeed they could achieve under their own power (e.g., the mallard flight speed record).

For these reasons, values given in this table are generally not appropriate to make comparisons between species.

== Birds by flying speed ==
Common name	Image	Species	Family	Average horizontal speed	Maximum horizontal speed	Maximum speed	Remarks
Peregrine falcon		Falco peregrinus	Falconidae	40–55 km/h 25–34 mph	112–160 km/h 70–99 mph	389 km/h 242 mph	Maximum speed is achieved via a streamlined, freefall dive from high altitudes. Self-powered horizontal flight can reach ~ 112 km/h (70 mph), but has been measured at up to 160 km/h (99 mph) when pulling out of a dive.
Gyrfalcon		Falco rusticolus	Falconidae	40–56 km/h 25–35 mph		187–209 km/h 116–130 mph	
Golden eagle		Aquila chrysaetos	Accipitridae	37–65 km/h 23–40 mph	190–195 km/h 118–121 mph		Maximum reported horizontal speed is the purported maximum of the species' gliding flight; the species can likely reach higher speeds in dives, though reported values of 240–320 km/h (150–200 mph) are "unlikely in most, if not all, situations".
Mallard		Anas platyrhynchos	Anatidae	57–87 km/h 35–54 mph		166 km/h 103 mph	Maximum reported speed was assisted by large tailwind.
Red-breasted merganser		Mergus serrator	Anatidae			130 km/h 81 mph	
Grey-headed albatross		Thalassarche chrysostoma	Diomedeidae		127 km/h 79 mph		Sustained reported horizontal speed (ground speed) for approximately nine hours with no rest on high tailwinds during an Antarctic storm. 2.2 m (7 ft 3 in) wingspan allows for high power use from wind.
Saker falcon		Falco cherrug	Falconidae	36–51 km/h 22–32 mph	111 km/h 69 mph		Flight speed is sometimes reported as up to 150 km/h (93 mph), though the speed of their dives do not appear to have ever been formally measured.
Common swift		Apus apus	Apodidae	32.4–38.2 km/h 20.1–23.7 mph	111.96 km/h 69.57 mph		This species holds the record for fastest recorded flight by a bird under its own power (e.g., not assisted by wind or gravity).
White-throated needletail		Hirundapus caudacutus	Apodidae	77 km/h 48 mph			An early report gave an estimated flight speed in excess of 161 km/h (100 mph), though this was not measured via any instruments and has not been observed since. Difficulties in human estimation of speed and altitude, especially in a moving vehicle, are well-known in relation to these swifts; nevertheless, unconfirmed maximum speed values for this species are still frequently reported.
Spur-winged goose		Plectropterus gambensis	Anatidae	approx. 96 km/h 60 mph			
Great snipe		Gallinago media	Scolopacidae	15–27 m/s 54–97 km/h			On 4,300–6,800 km non-stop autumn migration direct from Sweden to tropical Africa.
Eurasian whimbrel		Numenius phaeopus	Scolopacidae	18–24 m/s 65–86 km/h			On 4,000–5,500 km non-stop autumn migration direct from Iceland to West Africa.
Canvasback		Aythya valisineria	Anatidae			90–115 km/h 56–71 mph	
Common eider		Somateria mollissima	Anatidae	63 km/h 39 mph			
Whooper swan		Cygnus cygnus	Anatidae	60.1 km/h 37.3 mph	97–100 km/h 60–62 mph	160 km/h 100 mph (see Remarks, right)	Flying time on migration from Iceland to Ireland (1,100 km) on 9 December 1967 of an estimated 7 hours, making use of a 50 m/s (180 km/h; 100 kn) northerly jet stream wind at 8,200 m altitude in the lower stratosphere for part of the distance (where tolerating a temperature of -48°C, and air pressure only one third of surface pressure).
Bar-tailed godwit		Limosa lapponica	Scolopacidae	60 km/h 37 mph			Bird tagged 'E7' flew 11,680 km non-stop from Alaska to New Zealand in 8.1 days.
Black stork		Ciconia nigra	Ciconiidae	57.6 km/h 35.8 mph		112 km/h 70 mph	
Anna's hummingbird		Calypte anna	Trochilidae		56 km/h 35 mph	98.28 km/h 61.07 mph	Maximum speed was measured from a courtship dive, made possible by their extremely low drag.
Magnificent frigatebird		Fregata magnificens	Fregatidae	36.29 km/h 22.55 mph	46–48 km/h 29–30 mph		
Eurasian hobby		Falco subbuteo	Falconidae	20–25 km/h 12–16 mph			

== See also ==
- List of birds by flight heights
