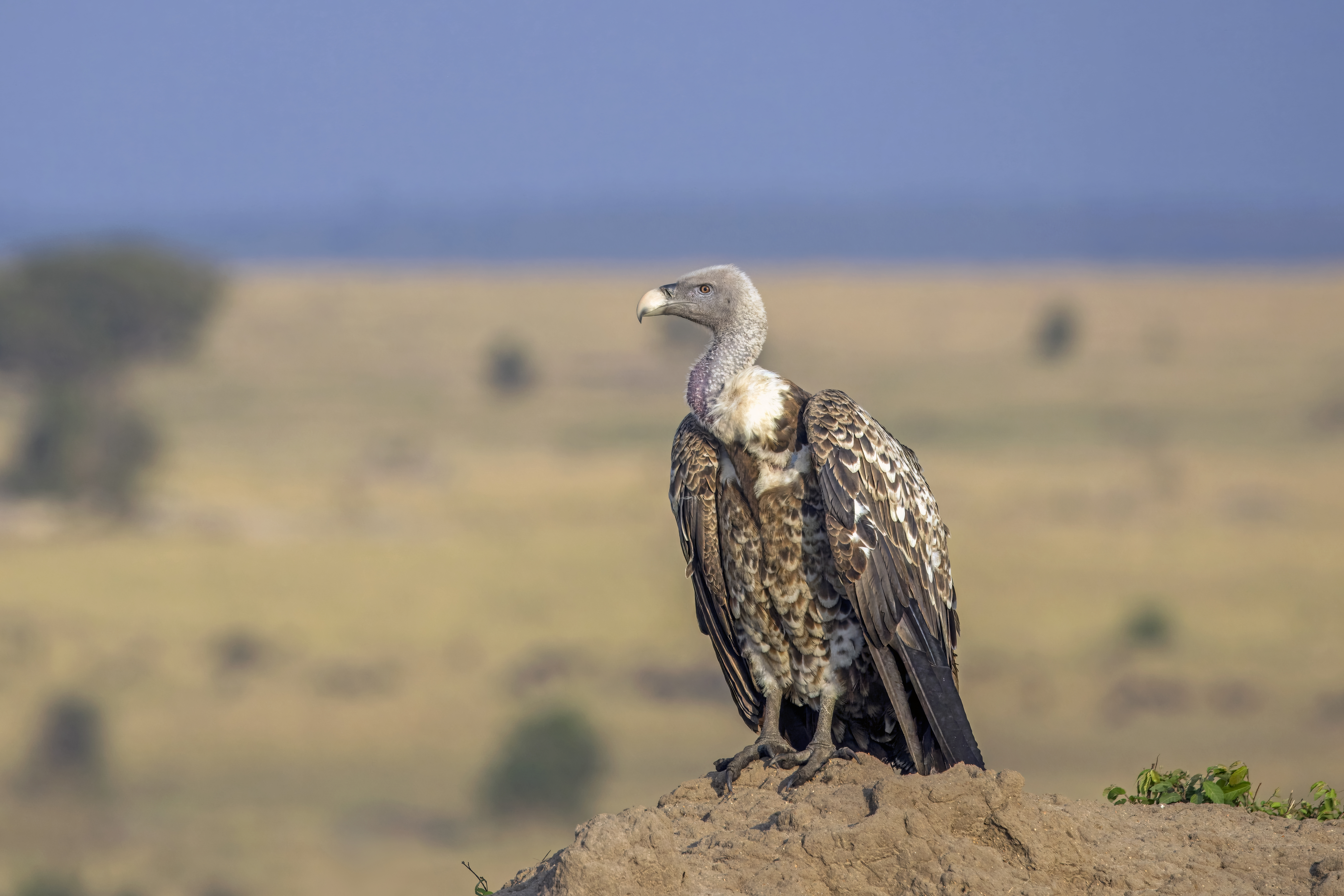
- In the Serengeti National Park, Tanzania

Conservation status
- Critically Endangered (IUCN 3.1)

Scientific classification
- Kingdom: Animalia
- Phylum: Chordata
- Class: Aves
- Order: Accipitriformes
- Family: Accipitridae
- Genus: Gyps
- Species: G. rueppelli

Binomial name
- Gyps rueppelli (Brehm, AE, 1852)

Subspecies
- G. r. rueppelli (Brehm, AE, 1852); G. r. erlangeri Salvadori, 1908

= Rüppell's vulture =

Species of bird

Rüppell's vulture (Gyps rueppelli), also called Rüppell's griffon vulture or Rüppell's griffon, a species of vulture named after Eduard Rüppell, is a large, resident bird of prey, mainly native to the Sahel region and East Africa. It is considered to be the highest-flying bird, with confirmed evidence of a flight at an altitude of 11,300 m (37,000 ft), where the average temperature is about −56 °C (−69 °F). The former population of 22,000 individuals has been decreasing due to loss of habitat, incidental poisoning, and other factors. It is therefore listed as Critically Endangered on the IUCN Red List.

== Distribution and habitat ==
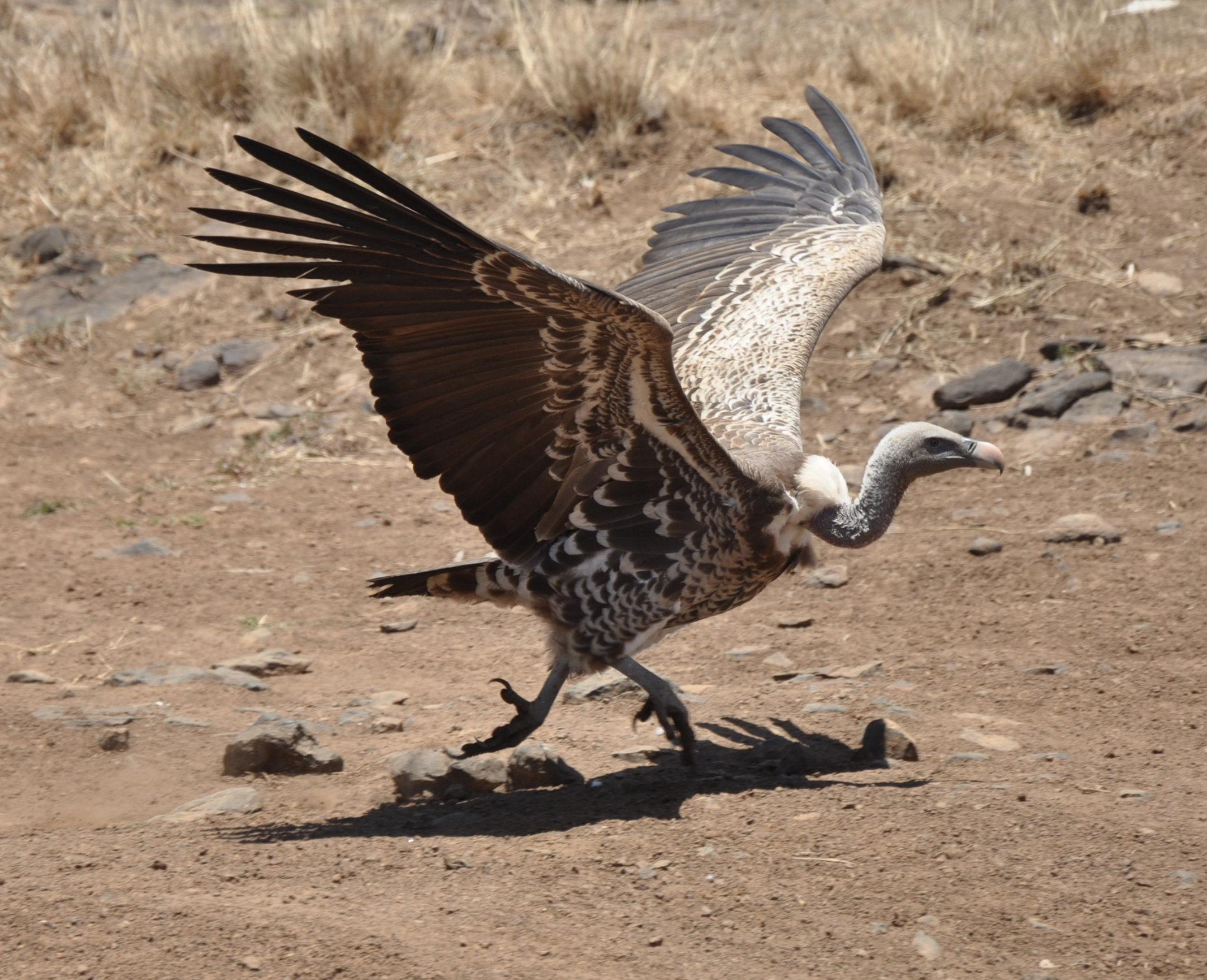
Rüppell's vulture in Nairobi National Park

Since 1992, Rüppell's vulture has been occurring as a vagrant in Spain and Portugal, with annual records since 1997, mainly in the Cádiz and Strait of Gibraltar area, but also further north. In Morocco, it is a resident species, where some tagged populations have been seen to overwinter.

== Description ==
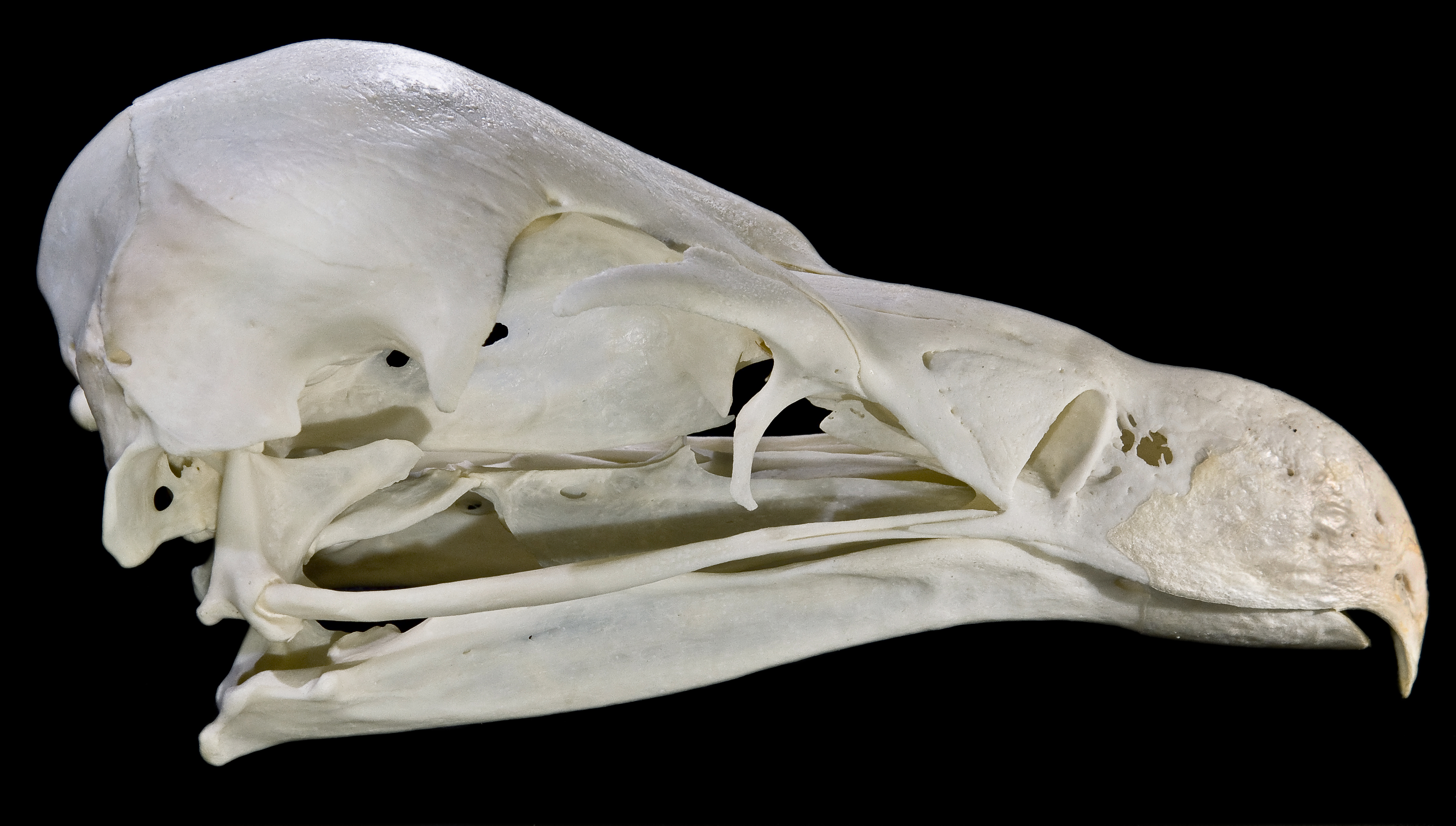
Skull without the rhamphotheca

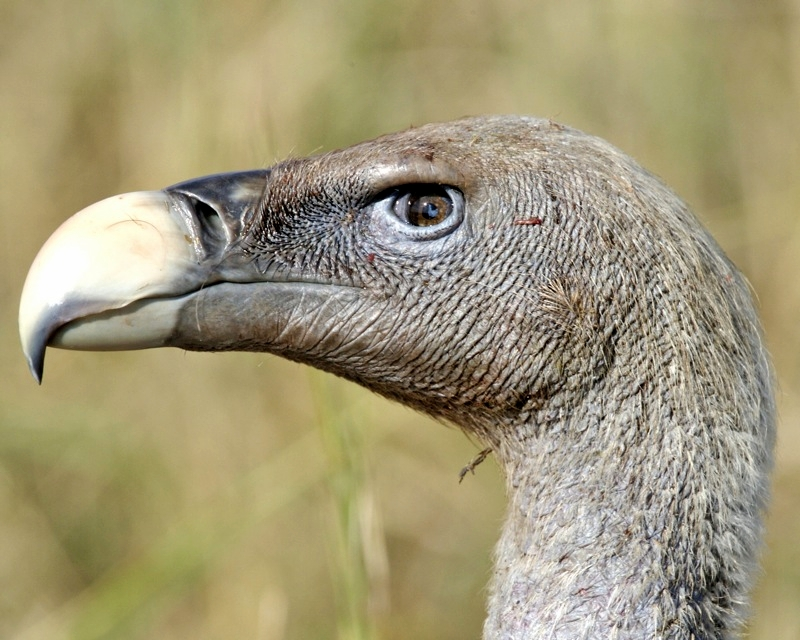
Head of an adult

The Rüppell's vulture is a very large vulture, noticeably outsizing the closely related white-backed vulture, with which they often occur in the wild. Adults are 85 to 103 cm (33 to 41 in) long, with a wingspan of 2.26 to 2.6 m (7 ft 5 in to 8 ft 6 in), and a weight that ranges from 6.4 to 9 kg (14 to 20 lb). Both sexes look alike: mottled brown or black overall with a whitish-brown underbelly and thin, dirty-white fluff covering the head and neck. The base of the neck has a white collar, the eye is yellow or amber, the crop patch deep brown. The head does not have feathers. This is an adaptation that occurred because of the Rüppell's vulture's tendency to stick its head inside of its prey when eating. Without the adaptation, feeding would become extremely messy. Silent as a rule, they become vocal at their nest and when at a carcass, squealing a great deal. Rüppell's vultures commonly fly at altitudes as high as 6,000 m (20,000 ft). The birds have a specialized variant of the hemoglobin alpha^{D} subunit; this protein has a great affinity for oxygen, which allows the species to absorb oxygen efficiently despite the low partial pressure in the upper troposphere. A Rüppell's vulture was confirmed to have passed into an aircraft engine of an airplane flying over Abidjan, Ivory Coast on 29 November 1973 at an altitude of 11,300 m (37,000 ft).

== Behavior and ecology ==
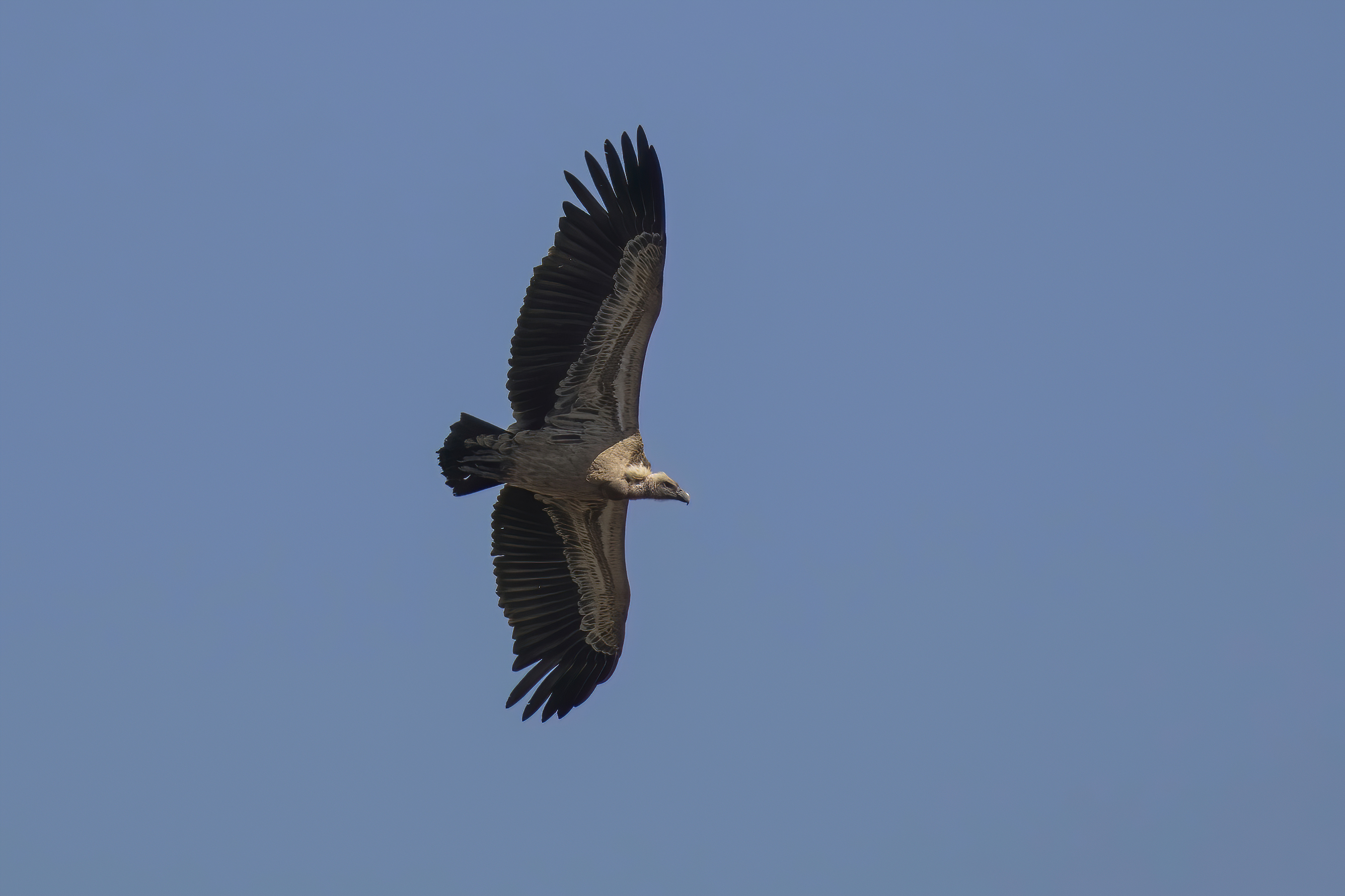
Rüppell's vulture in Ethiopia

=== Flight ===
Ruppell's vulture cruises at a speed of 35 km/h (22 mph), but flies for 6–7 hours every day. In optimal soaring conditions, these birds can reach up to 45 km/h during cross-country flight and between 70 and 85 km/h during straight glides. They can travel well over 100 km (62 mi) from a nest site to find food, even reaching 200 km (120 mi) when using updrafts.

=== Feeding ===
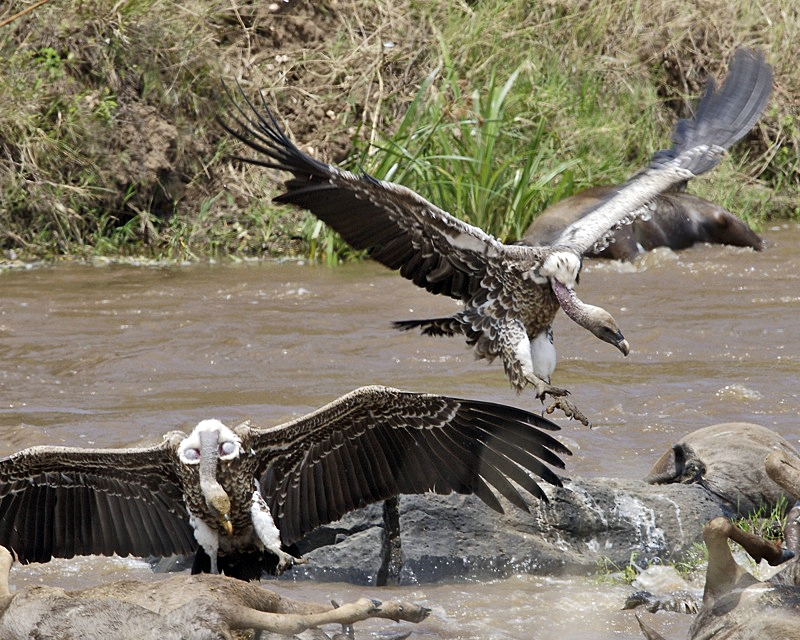
At a blue wildebeest carcass in the Mara River at the Masai Mara National Reserve

Strictly a carrion feeder, the Rüppell's vulture has been known to follow game herds on their seasonal migrations and feeds in large numbers at carcasses, usually with other Old World vulture species. Though it might take advantage of the remains of an animal killed by a lion, or other large predator, it can also feed on animals that have died from injuries, disease, or old age. Though they prefer freshly-killed meat, they can eat older carcasses without a problem. Rüppell's vultures have several adaptations to their diet and are specialized feeders even among the Old World vultures of Africa. They have an especially powerful build and, after the most attractive soft parts of a carcass have been consumed, they will continue with the hide, and even the bones, gorging themselves until they can barely fly. They have backward-pointing spikes on the tongue to help remove meat from bone. Despite their size, power and adaptations, they are not the most dominant vulture in their range; the most dominant species is considered to be the larger Lappet-faced vulture.

=== Reproduction ===
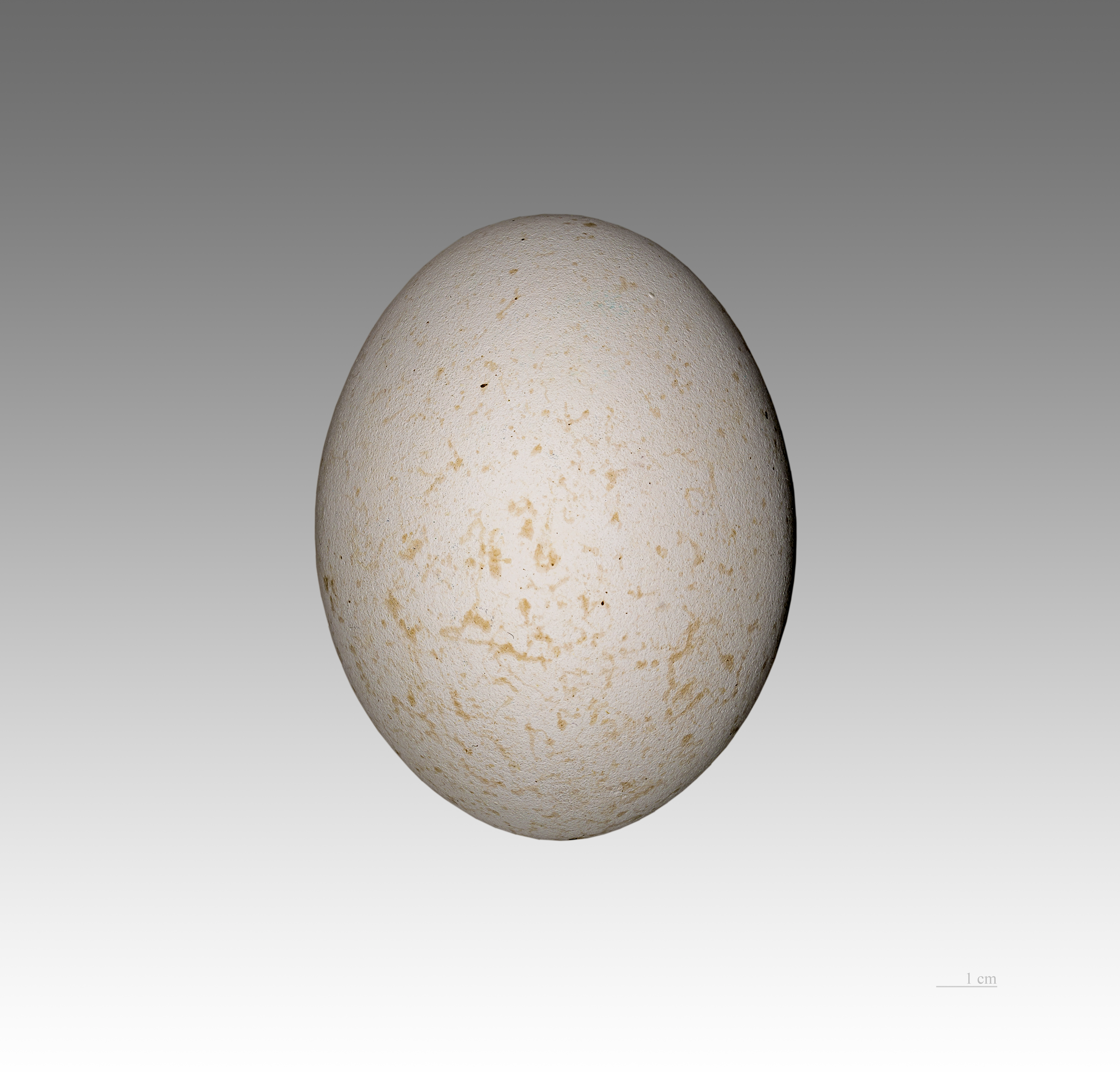
Egg

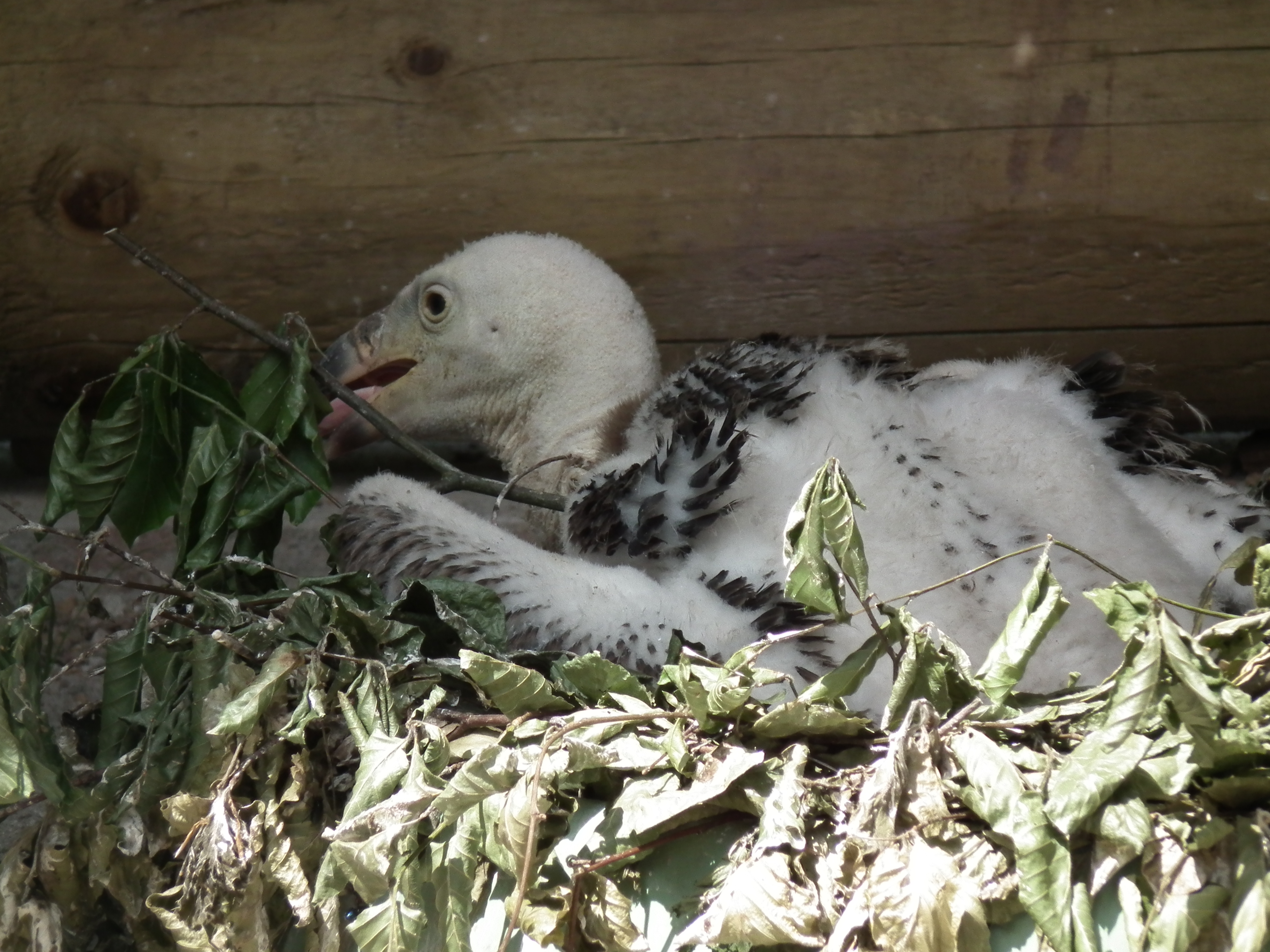
Nestling

This species of vulture is considered to be monogamous, forming lifelong breeding pairs. After courtship the pair will work together to build a nest using sticks, grass, and leaves that they have gathered or stolen from other nests. Rüppell's vultures build these nests on cliffs, and in key breeding areas they are known to nest in large colonies containing hundreds of breeding pairs. Both parents share in incubation of their egg over a period of 55 days. Once the chick hatches, both parents will feed and tend to it for about 150 days when it fledges. Young remain dependent on their parents after fledging, not reaching independence until the next breeding season. During this time they learn how to find and compete for food. Due to their large feeding range, they can only rear a single chick at a time. This results from the energy requirements needed for flight and foraging added on to the task of feeding their young.

=== Moult ===
The primary feathers of Ruppell's vultures are moulted continuously throughout their lives, typically beginning when they have spent 10 months out of the nest. In total, complete moult of all the primary feathers takes place over about 3 years.

== Conservation ==
Since first being assessed by the International Union for Conservation of Nature (IUCN) in 1988, populations of Rüppell's vulture have decreased. The species has been listed with an IUCN Red List status of "near threatened" since 2007, and populations are estimated to decline. From 2012 to 2014 the Rüppell's vulture was listed as Endangered; however, it was reassessed in 2015 as Critically Endangered.

Rüppell's vulture is currently listed as an Appendix II species under CITES, which regulates the international trade of animals and plants. Under this designation, the Rüppell's vulture is defined as not being immediately at risk of extinction, although the current population could become threatened without a careful regulation of trade.

The Moroccan Association for the Protection of Birds and Wildlife (AMPOVIS) has been in collaboration with the National Agency for Water and Forests (ANEF) at the vulture Rehabilitation Center (CRV - Jbel Moussa) since 2020. Their mission is to address several issues regarding the dispersion of this species in northern Morocco in the hopes that it will aid in conservation efforts and promote birdwatching in the Jbel Moussa Protected Area.

The total population of Rüppell's vulture has been estimated to be somewhere around 22,000 individuals, with specific populations in the following areas: Tanzania (3,000 pairs); Kenya (2,000 pairs); Ethiopia (2,000 pairs); Sudan (2,000 pairs); and West Africa (2,000 pairs).

== Threats ==
Rüppell's vulture populations are declining throughout the species' entire range. These declines can be attributed to loss of habitat related to human-related land use, poisoning, human use for medicine or meat, loss of nesting sites, and declining availability of food sources.

Poisoning is currently thought to be the most serious threat to all vulture populations in Africa, although they are not usually the intended target. In events where predators such as lions or hyenas have killed livestock, carbofuran poisons have been placed into carcasses as retaliation against the predators. Vultures utilize carrion as their main food source, and one carcass has the potential to attract hundreds of birds to feed because this species identifies food by sight. One evaluation of 10 poisoning events found that each event caused the death of 37 to 600 individuals.

Killing of Rüppell's vultures for use in medicine has also greatly contributed to the rapid population decline. In many African cultures, vultures are used for medicine and magic related to superstitions that they are clairvoyant and can be used to increase a child's intelligence. Establishing protected wildlife areas is thought to be an effective route to protect the Rüppell's vulture from extinction. The Rüppell's vulture breed and nests in cliffs in northern and southern Kenya, as well as Tanzania. These breeding and nesting grounds amass huge numbers of Rüppell's vultures which will raise young and forage in the surrounding area. Considering that the detection rate of Rüppell's vultures was found to be lower in protected areas than outside of them, extending protection to these key breeding sites could help support their population.

== See also ==
- The white-backed vulture, which is slightly smaller and has a shorter neck.
