= Hari Ziyad =

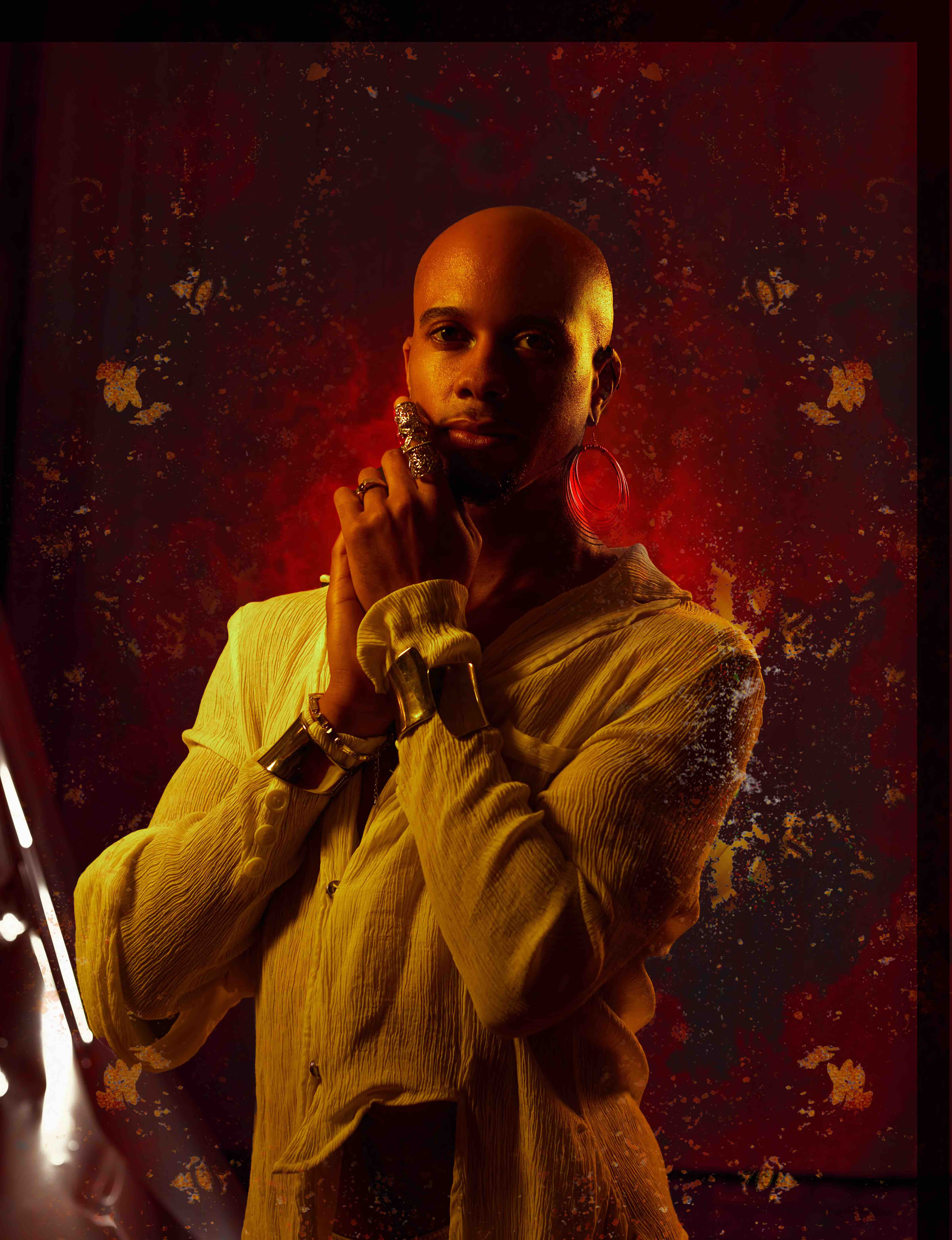
- Born: Hari-Gaura Ziyad; February 5, 1992 (age 34); Cleveland, Ohio
- Occupation: Writer
- Notable work: Black Boy Out of Time
- Television: The Neighborhood
- Mother: Krsnanandini Dasi

Hari Ziyad is a screenwriter and author whose debut book, the bestselling Black Boy Out of Time, is the story of growing up Black and queer in Cleveland, Ohio as one of nineteen children of a Hindu Hare Krishna mother and a Muslim father, and was recognized among the best LGBTQ books of 2021. They were previously a staff writer on The Neighborhood and a script consultant on David Makes Man.

They are an activist and the former creator and editor in chief of RaceBaitr, an online publication centered around the topics of race, gender, and prison and police abolition, which rose to prominence as the Jessica Krug story broke. They are also the former managing editor of the Black Youth Project, and their writing has been featured in Vanity Fair, Gawker, Out, The Guardian, Huffington Post, Ebony, Paste Magazine, and in the peer-reviewed academic journal Critical Ethnic Studies, among other publications.

== Early life ==
Ziyad was born in Cleveland, Ohio to father Tariq Ziyad, an African-American Muslim and former member of the Nation of Islam, and mother Krsnanandini Dasi, one of the first African-American followers of the Hare Krishna religion. They have eighteen siblings.

Ziyad has spoken extensively about how their multi-faith upbringing and being homeschooled before attending Cleveland Heights High School deeply affected their creative perspective and voice as a writer. They received their BFA in film and television from New York University.

== Personal life ==
Ziyad identifies as non-binary and queer, and they are a practitioner of Hoodoo. They live in Los Angeles, California.
