= José Bonilla (astronomer) =

Mexican astronomer (1853–1920)

- Born: José Árbol y Bonilla; February 5, 1853; Zacatecas, Zacatecas, Mexico
- Died: 1920 (aged 66–67); Mexico City, Mexico
- Known for: Bonilla observation, first person to photograph a UFO

José Árbol y Bonilla (February 5, 1853 – 1920) was a Mexican astronomer, engineer, and astrophotographer.

He is most known for the 1883 Bonilla observation, in which he observed and photographed hundreds objects passing in front of the Sun through a telescope. The identity of the objects he observed remained unknown until 2011 when they were identified as comet fragments.

The photographs that Bonilla took of his are some of the earliest examples of unidentified flying object photography.

== Early life ==
José Árbol y Bonilla was born on February 5, 1853, in Ciudad de Zacatecas, Zacatecas, Mexico. His parents were Francisco Árbol y Bonilla and María de Jesús Carrillo.

He studied topographical engineering in Zacatecas before being granted a scholarship to the Escuela de Minas in Mexico City by Zacatecas governor Gabriel García in 1873. He studied civil engineering at Escuela de Minas and completed the three-year course in one year. For this accomplishment, he won the 1875 Premio al Mérito (Award of Merit) from President Sebastián Lerdo de Tejada.

== Career ==
After his graduation in 1874, Bonilla returned to Zacatecas and became a teacher at the García Literary Institute where he also began studying science and technology. In 1879, he moved to Paris to study celestial photography at the Paris Astronomical Observatory where he became a member of the Flammarion Scientific Society of Paris.

On December 6, 1882, the Astronomical Observatory in the State of Zacatecas opened in Ciudad de Zacatecas with Bonilla acting as director. It was the first major astronomical observatory in Mexico to be opened outside of Mexico City. It was while he was director of the Zacatecas observatory when he made his famous Bonilla observation in 1883.

Bonilla would serve as director of the Zacatecas observatory until 1911 when he became the director of the National School of Arts and Crafts in Mexico City.

== Bonilla observation ==
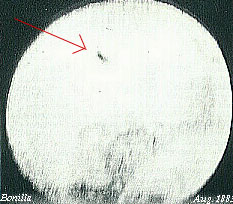
One of Bonilla's photographs from the Bonilla observation

On August 12, 1883, Bonilla was preparing his telescope for observations when he observed multiple objects pass in front of the Sun. Over the course of the next day and a half, he took 447 photographs of the objects with wet plates.

Bonilla's observations first reached the public in 1886 when his findings were detailed in the January 1, 1886 edition of the French astronomical journal L’Astronomie. Bonilla had previously sent its founder, French physicist Camille Flammarion, his findings, which led to them being published after over two years of being kept private. The release of his work was questioned by Flammarion and others, who dismissed his findings as birds, insects, or dust.

In October 2011, researchers from the National Autonomous University of Mexico published a paper concluding that Bonilla's observation was actually fragments of a comet that had exploded and were passing in front of the sun.

Interest in the Bonilla observation was rekindled by UFO enthusiasts on the Internet as the observation was the first case of an unsolved photograph of an unidentified flying object, and a mystery that took 125 years to solve.

== Personal life ==
Bonilla married Aurelia Hierro Alcántara in September 1878. They would have two kids together. José Bonilla died in 1920 in Mexico City.
