= Bonilla observation =

1883 astronomical event

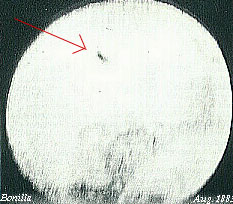
One of the photographs from the Bonilla observation.

The Bonilla observation was an astronomical event in 1883 in which hundreds of unidentified flying objects were observed and photographed by Mexican astronomer José Bonilla.

The photographs taken during the Bonilla observation are generally regarded as one of the first known examples of photographs of "unidentified flying objects". Though the objects were assumed to be flocks of high-flying geese, astronomers have suggested more recently that Bonilla was observing a nearby comet breaking apart.

== Background ==
José A. y Bonilla (1853-1920) was a Mexican astronomer. Educated in engineering and astrophotography in Zacatecas, Mexico City, and Paris, he was elected the first director of the Astronomical Observatory in the State of Zacatecas in Ciudad de Zacatecas, Zacatecas, Mexico in 1882.

The Astronomical Observatory in the State of Zacatecas was opened in December 1882. It is now known as the Meteorological Observatory Zacatecas.

== Event ==
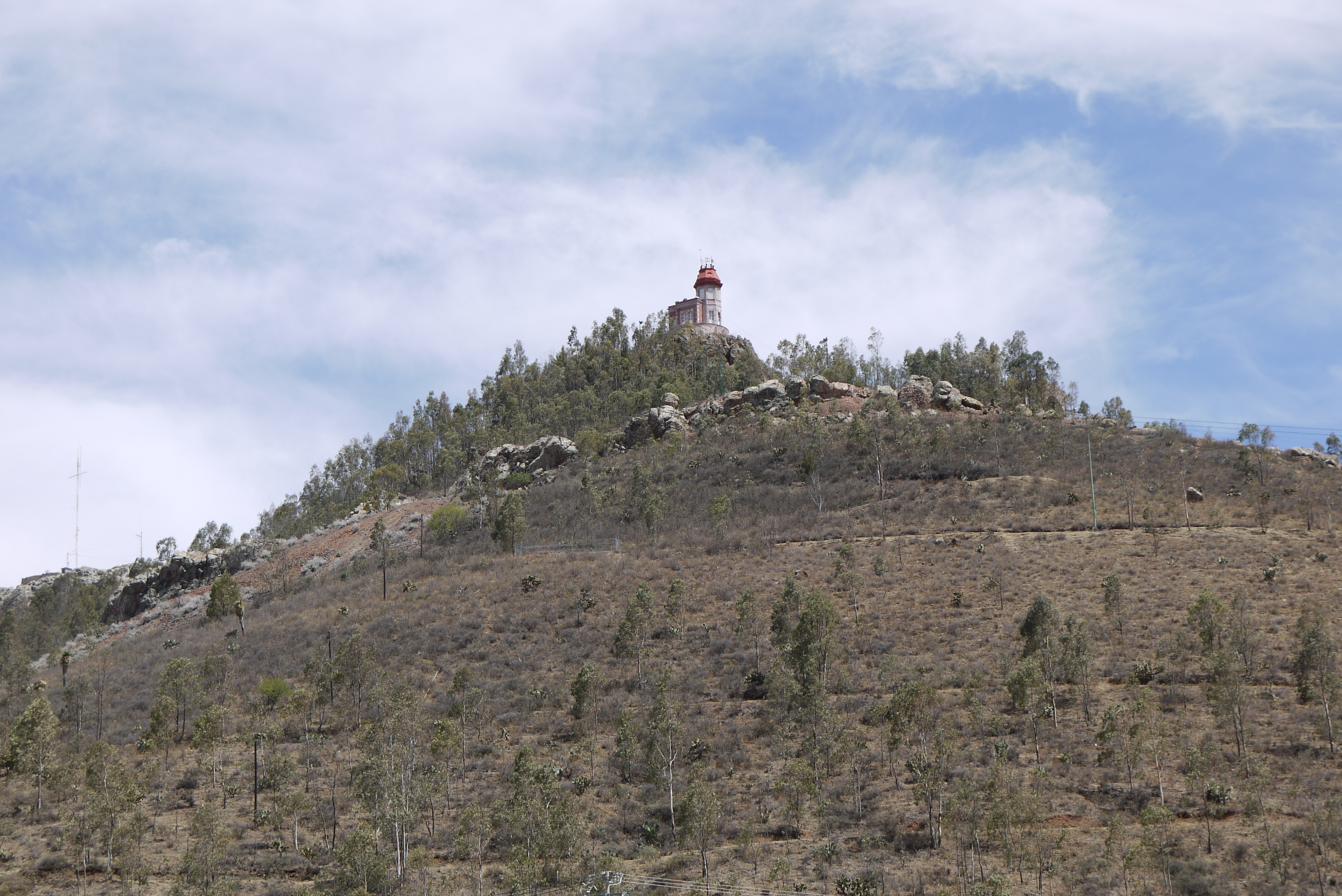
The observatory atop La Bufa Hill, where the sighting took place.

On August 12, 1883, Bonilla was preparing his telescope for a study when he noticed that objects seemed to be partially blocking the Sun. Intrigued, Bonilla spent the next 48 hours using a process known as collodion process to capture 447 ink photographs of the objects.

Along with his photographs, Bonilla also left descriptions of what he noticed in order to clarify what the low-quality ink images were showing, as well as a significant amount of data. Bonilla described the objects as 'fuzzy' or 'misty' in nature, and often referred to objects that had 'dark tails'.

== Investigation ==
Bonilla's observations were published in the January 1, 1886 edition of the French astronomy magazine L’Astronomie where the magazine's founder and editor, French physicist Camille Flammarion, could not come to a specific conclusion as to what Bonilla had observed, but Flammarion believed that Bonilla had misperceived birds, insects, or dust in front of his telescope as being in space. Bonilla died in 1920 in Mexico City.

In October 2011, astronomy researchers Héctor Manterola, María Ramos Lara, and Guadalupe Cordero from the National Autonomous University of Mexico in Mexico City released a preprint detailing their conclusion that what Bonilla had witnessed were fragments of a comet that had exploded in space. Manterola defended his theory by explaining that parallax made it so that only places along the same latitude as Zacatecas were able to witness the event. The African and Asian civilizations on the same latitude did not have the means of observing this event.

Assuming Bonilla's timings to be correct, Manterola's team calculated a distance to the objects as between 538 kilometers (334 mi) and 8,062 kilometers (5,009 mi) above ground, and between 68 meters (223 ft) and 795 meters (2,608 ft) in length. If made of ice, they would be between 5.58×10^{8} kilograms (1.23×10^{7} lbs) and 2.5×10^{12} kilograms (5.51×10^{10} lbs) in mass. Extrapolating Bonilla's observation of 447 objects over a period of 3 hours 25 minutes to 3275 fragments over a 25 hour period, Manterola et al. estimated that the original comet had a mass between 1.83×10^{12} kilograms (4.03×10^{10} lbs) and 8.19×10^{15} kilograms (1.81×10^{14} lbs). This spans three and a half orders of magnitude. Manterola et al. note that the upper bound is equivalent to 8.19 times the mass of Halley's Comet, and likened the potential impact of these comet fragments to the 1908 Tunguska event, stating "...if [the fragments] had collided with Earth we would have had 3,275 Tunguska events in two days -- probably an extinction event."

== Impact on culture ==
The Bonilla observation is considered to be one of the first ever instances of a photograph of a UFO. The story became a focus of interest for UFO enthusiasts on the Internet after the 2011 study was released.
