= List of birds by flight heights =

This is a list of birds that have been recorded flying at particularly high altitudes. The average altitude for avian flight during migration is 400—800 metres AGL.

== Birds by flight height ==
Bird	Image	Species	Family	Maximum height (AMSL)	Details
Rüppell's vulture		Gyps rueppellii	Accipitridae	11,300 metres (37,000 feet)	Vultures use their excellent eyesight to scan the landscape below from a relatively static aerial position. Instead of flying over a larger distance, they use elevation to expand their field of vision. A bird strike was recorded at this height in 1973.
Common crane		Grus grus	Gruidae	10,000 metres (33,000 ft)	This height was recorded above the Himalayas. This is atypical; the species typically alters its migration routes to avoid mountains. Across other parts of their range, they rarely reach altitudes higher than 1,000 metres.
Bar-headed goose		Anser indicus	Anatidae	8,800 metres (29,000 ft)	They also fly over the peaks of the Himalayas on their migratory path.
Great snipe		Gallinago media	Scolopacidae	8,700 metres (29,000 ft)	Highest known individual of a group of great snipe tagged with data loggers. The species regularly migrates at average heights of 2,000 m at night and 4,000 m during daytime, with most birds regularly reaching 6,000 m. These flights were typically 4,000–7,000 km non-stop, lasting 60–90 hours.
Whooper swan		Cygnus cygnus	Anatidae	8,200 metres (27,000 ft)	This height was attained by a flock of about 30 whooper swans flying south from Iceland over western Scotland to Northern Ireland, recorded by air traffic control radar and verified by an airline pilot diverted to check. The birds were using a northerly 50 m/s (180 km/h) jet stream wind in the lower stratosphere to speed their migration, despite the ambient -48°C temperature.
Alpine chough		Pyrrhocorax graculus	Corvidae	8,000 metres (26,000 ft)	This height was recorded on Mount Everest.
Bearded vulture		Gypaetus barbatus	Accipitridae	7,300 metres (24,000 ft)	
Black kite		Milvus migrans	Accipitridae	6,500 metres (21,000 ft)	
Andean condor		Vultur gryphus	Cathartidae	6,500 metres (21,000 ft)	
Mallard		Anas platyrhynchos	Anatidae	6,400 metres (21,000 ft)	This height was recorded over Nevada; This record occurred when a Lockheed L-188 Electra turboprop airliner operating a Western Airlines flight suffered a bird strike at cruising altitude.
Bar-tailed godwit		Limosa lapponica	Scolopacidae	6,000 metres (20,000 ft)	It can reach this height while migrating.
Black-tailed godwit		Limosa limosa	Scolopacidae	5,956 metres (19,540 ft)	The highest recorded on migration, with birds tagged with data loggers regularly migrating at over 5,000 metres.
White stork		Ciconia ciconia	Ciconiidae	4,800 metres (16,000 ft).	It can reach this height while migrating.

== See also ==
- Organisms at high altitude
- List of birds by flight speed
