= Iñaki Bonillas =

Mexican artist

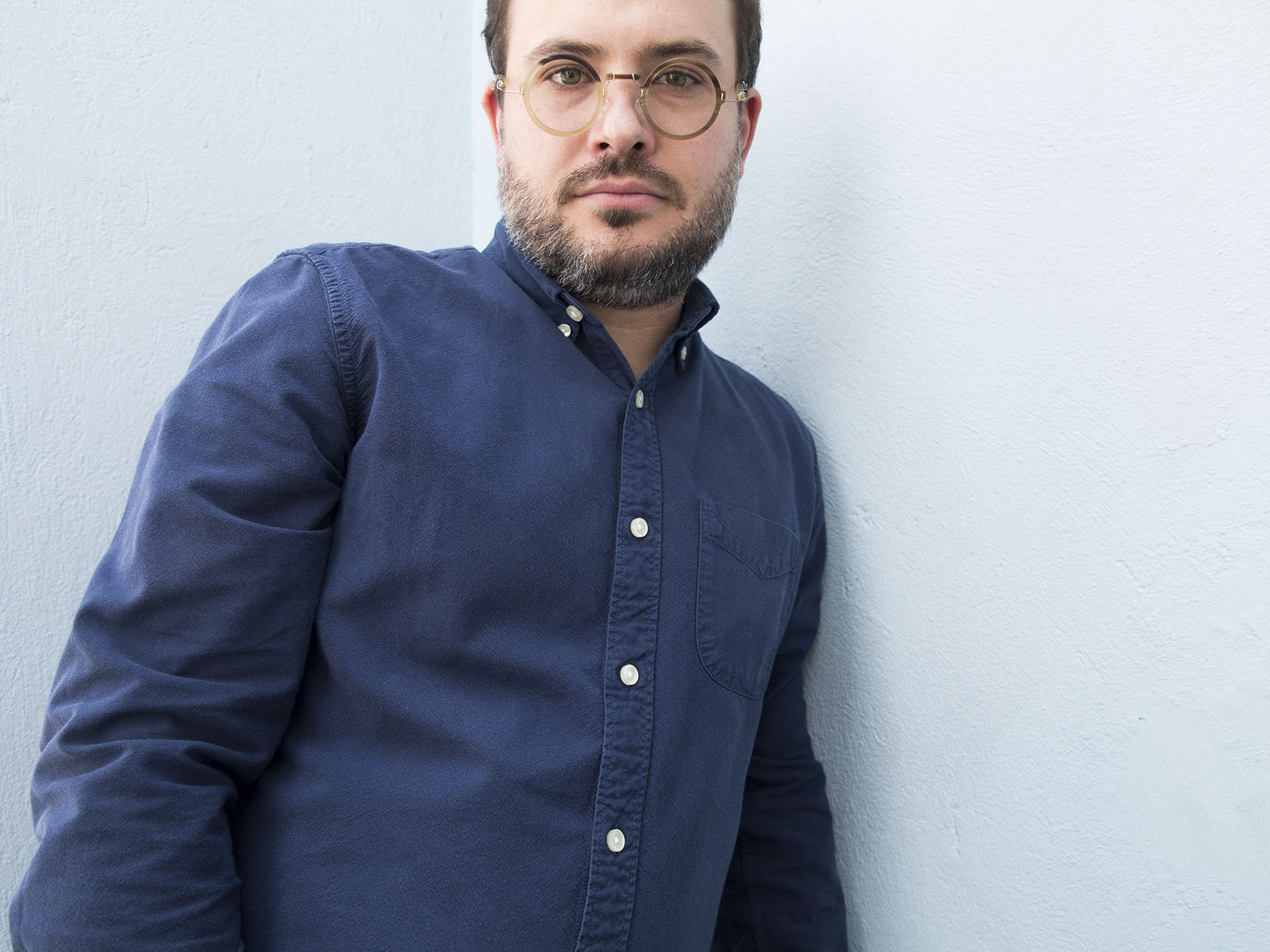
Selfie of the Mexican artist Iñaki Bonillas.

Iñaki Bonillas (born 1981 in Mexico City) is an artist living and working in Mexico City. His recent work is based on the photographic archive of his grandfather J.R. Plaza and family. In 2007 he participated in a group exhibition at Claremont Museum of Art.

== Exhibitions ==
Solo Exhibitions

- 2020 Diario de Sucesos poco notables [Journal of (Un) remarkable events], ProjecteSD, Barcelona, Spain
- 2016 Secretos. Estancia FEMSA, Casa Luis Barragán, Mexico City, Mexico.
- 2015 Photogravures. BORCHs Butik, Copenhagen, Denmark.
- 2014 The Idea of North. ProjecteSD, Barcelona, Spain.
- 2014 The Disappearance. Nordenhake, Stockholm, Sweden.
- 2013 (Détail). Greta Meert, Brussels, Belgium.
- 2013 Captain Oates. Art Basel 44/Art Unlimited, Basel, Switzerland.
- 2013 The Story of the Sinking Ship, Which Is a Ship and yet Is Not. LIGA, Space for Architecture, Mexico City, Mexico.
- 2013 The Rain Came Last. OMR, Mexico City, Mexico.
- 2012 The Encyclopedia of the Dead. Nordenhake, Berlin, Germany. The Eyes. Niels Borch Jensen, Berlin, Germany.
- 2012 Arxiu J.R. Plaza. La Virreina Centre de la Imatge, Barcelona, Spain.
- 2011 The Eyes. Capella de Sant Roc, Valls, Spain.
- 2011 Double Chiaroscuro. Les Rencontres d'Arles, Arles, France. Days in the Countryside. Greta Meert, Brussels, Belgium.
- 2010 Ghost Stories of an Antiquary. ProjecteSD, Barcelona, Spain.
- 2010 The Expression of the Emotions in Men and Animals. Hermes und der Pfau, Stuttgart, Germany.
- 2010 The Mirror’s Ideas. Sonia Rosso. Turin, Italy.
- 2010 Double Chiaroscuro. Art Basel 41/Art Statements, Basel, Switzerland.
- 2010 The Return to the Origin. OMR, Mexico City, Mexico.
- 2009 Circular Thinking: an Anthology. Museo de Arte Moderno MAM, Mexico City, Mexico.
- 2009 No Longer, Not Yet. Sonia Rosso, Turin, Italy. 2008 Thought Figures. Greta Meert, Brussels, Belgium.
- 2007 A sombra e o brilho. ProjecteSD, Barcelona, Spain. The Topoanalyst. Matadero, Madrid, Spain.
- 2007 Shipwreck with Spectator. OMR, Mexico City, Mexico.
- 2006 Bañeras. La casa verde, Mexico City.
- 2006 Iñaki Bonillas: Isabel Price, COFF Foundation. Sala Kubo Kutxaespacio del Arte, San Sebastian, Spain.
- 2005 J.R. Plaza Archive. ProjecteSD, Barcelona, Spain.
- 2005 Intervention to the Pavilion. Mies van Der Rohe Pavilion, Barcelona, Spain. Dead Archive. _h4cht, Mexico City, Mexico.
- 2004 Five Minutes to Die. OMR, Mexico City, Mexico.
- 2003 Little History of Photography. MUHKA, Antwerp, Belgium.
- 2003 Work in Collaboration, with Pieter Vermeersch. OMR, Mexico City, Mexico.
- 2003 Iñaki Bonillas. Meert Rihoux, Brussels, Belgium.
- 2002 Photographic Views from a Wall. Galería de Arte Mexicano GAM, Mexico City, Mexico.
- 2001 Audiovisivi. Bordone, Milan, Italy.
- 2000 Project Room. Museo de Arte Carrillo Gil, Mexico City, Mexico. Dark Room. Colima 385, Mexico City, Mexico.
- 2000 607 W. Proyecto Zapopan, Guadalajara, Mexico.
- 1999 Lighting. Zacatecas 89, Mexico City, Mexico.
- 1998 Photo Aperture. La BF.15, Monterrey, Mexico.
- 1998 Photographic Work. Regina 51, Mexico City, Mexico.

Group Exhibitions

- 2016 Crisis of Presence. Pori Art Museum, Pori, Finland.
- 2015 How to Do Art with Words. MUSAC, León, Spain.
- 2015 Écrit sur du vent: Iñaki Bonillas & Bertrand Lamarche. La Compagnie, Lieu de Création, Marseille, France.
- 2015 Tulum Hotel: PRODUCTORA + Iñaki Bonillas. Chicago Architecture Biennial, Chicago, United States.
- 2015 Strange Currencies: Art & Action in Mexico City, 1990-2000. The Galleries at Moore, Philadelphia, United States.
- 2015 (Ready) Media. LABoral, Gijón, Spain.
- 2015 General Indisposition. An Essay About Fatigue. Fabra i Coats, Centre d’Art Contemporani, Barcelona, Spain.
- 2015 Another Part of the New World. Moscow Museum of Modern Art, Moscow, Russia.
- 2015 This-Hasn't-Happened. Centro de Arte 2 de Mayo CA2M, Madrid, Spain. Desires and Necessities. MACBA, Barcelona, Spain.
- 2014 The Marvellous Real / Art from Mexico 1926-2011. Museum of Anthropology, Vancouver, Canada.
- 2014 Credit to the Edit. Cneai, Chatou, France.
- 2014 The Depth of the Surface. Museum of Art of Sinaloa, Culiacán, Mexico.
- 2014 Goethe Dialogues. Goethe Institute, Barcelona, Spain.
- 2014 Rumors of the Meteor. Frac Lorraine, Metz, France.
- 2014 Punctum. Salzburger Kunstverein, Salzburg, Austria.
- 2014 Iñaki Bonillas & Sandra Vasquez de la Horra. Niels Borch Jensen, Berlin, Germany.
- 2014 Variation. The Obsessive as Kind of Landscape. Centro de Arte Alcobendas, Madrid, Spain.
- 2014 Pieces for a Collection. Bernal Espacio, Madrid, Spain.
- 2014 Latin America 1960-2013. Amparo Museum, Puebla, Mexico.
- 2013 Jetztzeit (Present Time) + The Angel’s Back. Centre d’Art la Panera, Lleida, Spain.
- 2013 Confusion in the Vault. Jumex Museum, Mexico City, Mexico.
- 2013 Latin America 1960-2013. Fondation Cartier pour l’art contemporain, Paris, France.
- 2013 Reanimation Library. Talcual, Mexico City, Mexico.
- 2013 Thinking and Speaking. Nordenhake, Stockholm, Sweden.
- 2013 Paint it Black. FRAC Île de France, Le Plateau, Paris, France.
- 2013 Turn off the Sun: Selections from The Jumex Collection. ASU Art Museum, Phoenix, United States.
- 2012 Reality is a Persistent Illusion. CAL CEGO, Barcelona, Spain.
- 2012 Accrochage X: Works on Paper. Greta Meert, Brussels, Belgium. Narrativas domésticas: más allá del álbum familiar. Sala de exposiciones Diputación de Huesca, Huesca, Spain.
- 2012 Donde el lenguaje es material. Casa del Lago Juan José Arreola, Mexico City, Mexico.
- 2012 The Imminence of Poetics. Thirtieth Biennial of São Paulo, Brazil.
- 2012 Art & Books. Den Frie, Copenhagen, Denmark.
- 2012 Poule! Jumex Collection, Mexico City, Mexico.
- 2012 Resisting the Present. Musée d'Art moderne de la Ville de Paris / ARC, Paris, France.
- 2011 Exhibition. Galerie van der Mieden, Antwerp, Belgium.
- 2011 Tiempo de sospecha. Museo de Arte Moderno MAM, Mexico City, Mexico. The Space Between Now and Then. OMR, Mexico City, Mexico.
- 2011 Beyond. KUMU Art Museum, Tallinn, Estonia.
- 2011 Resisting the Present. Amparo Museum, Puebla, Mexico.
- 2011 A Serpentine Gesture and Other Prophecies. FRAC Lorraine, Metz, France. Accrochage IX: Photography. Greta Meert, Brussels, Belgium.
- 2011 Mexico: Expected / Unexpected. Museum of Contemporary Art, San Diego, United States.

== Works of Art ==
To create A Card for J.R. Plaza, Iñaki Bonillas pored over photographs, albums, and slides he inherited from his grandfather, J. R. Plaza. Included in the archive was a sheet of business cards, each corresponding to a position Plaza held during his professional life as a salesman.

Intermixed among these were eleven cards Plaza designed and typed, representing professions he never held, including borreguero (shepherd) and modelo (model). Inspired by the cards, Bonillas paired several of his grandfather’s self-portraits with the fictitious business cards, playfully exploring Plaza’s interest in self-presentation and constructing a series of new narratives about his own family history. Bonillas also inherited Plaza’s typewriter, which inspired him to create one last business card: “self-portraitist.”
