= Bonilla, South Dakota =

Unincorporated community in South Dakota, U.S.

Coordinates: 44°34′58″N 98°29′57″W

Bonilla is an unincorporated community in Beadle County, in the U.S. state of South Dakota.

== History ==
Bonilla was laid out in 1884. A post office called Bonilla was established in 1883, and remained in operation until 1973. The community was named by William Kelley after the former President of Honduras, Manuel Bonilla. Alternatively, the name could also come from a corrupted French word for "good village".
