= Juan C. Bonilla (municipality) =

Coordinates: 19.1091°N 98.3290°W

- Municipality
- Location of the municipality in Puebla
- Country: Mexico
- State: Puebla
- Time zone: UTC-6 (Zona Centro)

Juan C. Bonilla is a municipality in the Mexican state of Puebla. It is named after Juan Crisóstomo Bonilla.
