= José María Bonilla =

Guatemalan writer, artist and pedagogue (1889–1957)

José María Bonilla Ruano
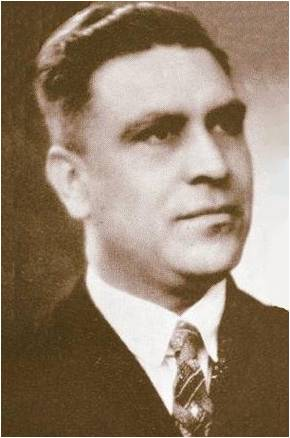
- Born: 1889
- Died: 1957 (aged 67–68)
- Occupation: Writer

José María Bonilla Ruano (1889–1957) was a Guatemalan writer, artist and pedagogue, best known for his didactical works and modifications made to the Guatemala anthem in 1934.

== Biography ==
Bonilla's parents were Adelaida Ruano Marroquín and José María Bonilla Carrillo. He completed his early studies in his native Jalapa. Before he turned 17, Bonilla received his teacher-training certificate from the Central Normal School of Professors. Immediately after, he graduated with a bachelor's degree in science and letters from the National Central Institute of Men. As Bonilla continued his studies for his bachelor's degree, he was in charge of the direction of the preparatory school annexed to the Institute- making him a secondary school professor for many years.

In the Public Education branch, Bonilla was also the head of Normal, Secondary, and Special Education, a professor at the National University (summer courses), and member of the Departmental Board and the Advisory Committee.

On 24 October 1930, the Real Academy of Madrid awarded Bonilla his diploma in the class of Foreign Correspondence in Guatemala. Later on, the members of the Guatemalan Academy unanimously voted him in as Censor of said academy.

== Works ==
Bonilla published the Curso Didáctico y Razonado de Gramática Castellana (The Didactic and Reasoned Course of Castilian Grammar). Upon being published in 1923, it was adopted as a textbook in secondary teaching establishments. The Guatemalan press highlighted this book and the "Obra de Derecho Internacional Privado" (Work of Private International Rights) by Doctor Jose Matos. These works were edited almost simultaneously in the same workshop and were the most complete works in their respective genres at that time.

Anotaciones Crítico-didácticas (Critical Didactic Annotations) is a long exposition of the motives surrounding the substantial reforms to the lyrics of "Guatemala, feliz" (The National Anthem of Guatemala written by José Joaquín Palma). These reforms were adopted by government agreement on 26 July 1934. Bonilla's work was written in Brussels, Belgium and printed on the author's own property. The work also contains a universal hymnbook with Spanish translations. It is about various civic and international issues in connection with the other patriotic symbols of Guatemala.

=== Poetry ===
- La feria de Jocotenango (1944)
- Efigies Líricas (1953)

=== Prose ===
- Curso didáctico y razonado de gramática castellana (1923)
- Mosaico de voces y locuciones viciosas (1930)
- Anotaciones crítico – didácticas sobre el poema del himno nacional de Guatemala (1935)
- Jalapa, emporio cultular de oriente (1943)
- Snobismo y psitacismo (1946)
- Acontencimiento bibliográfico (1956)
- Reseña Lexicográfica (1957)
- Nociones prácticas de lengua castellana y corrección del lenguaje (1957)
- Humo y humoradas
