= Leydy Bonilla =

Dominican-American bachata singer

Leydy Bonilla (born 1980) is an American bachata singer. Bonilla was born and raised in Nagua, Dominican Republic. At the age of 16, she moved with her family to The Bronx, New York, where she began competing in talent shows. She was signed to record for JM Records of Spain. Following the release of her first album, Nada sin ti (Nothing without You) which featured merengues and cumbias, she toured in Europe. In 2001 she released her 2nd album Estoy Enamorada (I'm In Love) which sold more than 50,000 records. In 2004 she moved to Charlotte, North Carolina.
