= José Joaquín Palma =

Cuban writer of Guatemala's national anthem (1844–1911)

José Joaquín Palmá Lasso
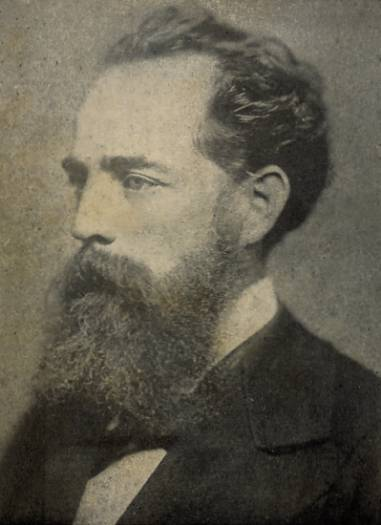
- Palma in 1875
- Born: September 11, 1844; Bayamo, Cuba
- Died: August 2, 1911 (aged 66); Guatemala City, Guatemala
- Occupations: diplomat, professor, journalist, poet
- Spouse: Leonela del Castillo
- Children: José Joaquín, Carlos, Zoila América Ana Palma del Castillo
- Writing career
- Pen name: Cantor de la Patria
- Notable works: Tinieblas del Alma; Poesías; Letra del Himno Nacional de Guatemala
- Notable awards: Medalla de Oro de Primera Clase de Honduras; Medalla de Oro de Guatemala (Note: Por ser el autor del Himno Nacional de ese país centroamericano.) (1911); Hijo Predilecto de Bayamo (1951, póstumo); Mayor General del Ejército cubano (1951, póstumo)

José Joaquín Palma Lasso (September 11, 1844 – August 2, 1911) was a Cuban writer who was the author of the Guatemalan national anthem's lyrics.

== Biography ==
He was the son of Pedro Palma y Aguilera and Dolores Lasso de la Vega and went to "San José" School in Bayamo under the direction of José María Izaguirre whom he would later meet again in Guatemala. He wrote poetry since his youth and is considered an important Cuban poet.

He joined the revolutionaries of the Ten Years' War in Cuba (1868–1878) and served briefly as a recruiter for the revolutionary forces and as an aid to Carlos Manuel de Céspedes, the leader of the insurrection. When Bayamo was about to fall to the Spanish forces, he set fire to his own house in the citywide fire started by the residents.

He went to Jamaica, New York City and Guatemala in an attempt to gain support for the Cuban insurrection. In Guatemala he met the Honduran Marco Aurelio Soto and his cousin Ramón Rosa who in 1876 -with the help of Guatemalan president Justo Rufino Barrios became president and Prime Minister of Honduras, respectively. He went to Honduras as private secretary to President Soto in 1876 and left this county and returned to Guatemala when Soto resigned as president, forced by his former ally, Justo Rufino Barrios.

Not until 14 years later, in 1910, did he reveal that he was the author. He received a gold medal from the Guatemalan government for his literary and patriotic contributions.

By the end of the 1890s, Palma had developed a strong friendship with public speaker and journalist Rafael Spinola, editor in chief of La Ilustración Guatemalteca and also secretary of Infrastructure of president Manuel Estrada Cabrera; by 1899, Mexican writer and diplomat Federico Gamboa arrived to Guatemala as interim Mexican Ambassador and got to know both Spinola and Palma quite well.

== National Anthem of Guatemala ==
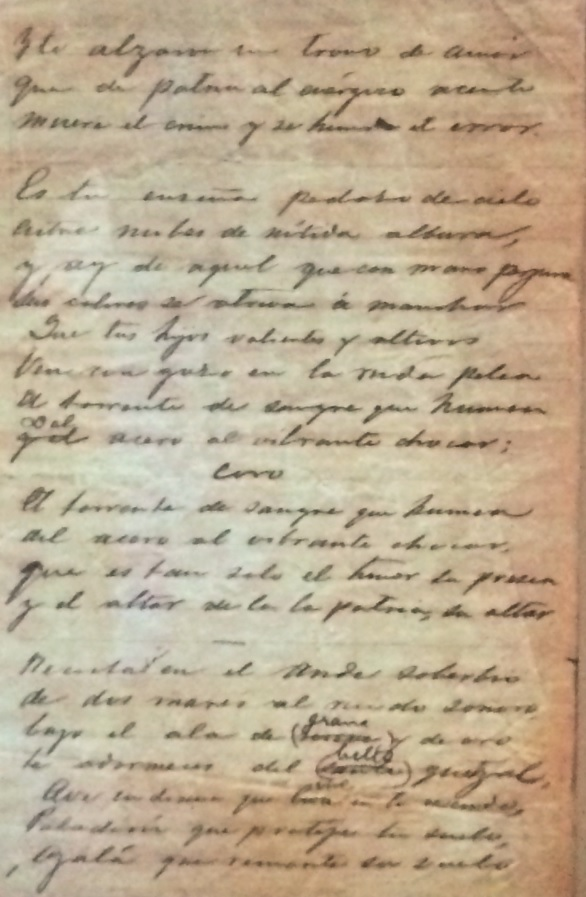
Facsimile con J.J. Palma original handwriting with a section of the National Anthem of Guatemala, as written in 1897. Museo de Historia Nacional de Guatemala.

In 1896 the Guatemalan president José María Reina Barrios promoted a contest to select the lyrics of the national anthem - the National Anthem of Guatemala. The winning piece was entered anonymously and won by unanimous decision; Palma was part of the jury that selected the winner lyrics.

In the 1900s, it was frequent that he wrote contributions for the Albumes de Minerva, official proceedings magazine of the Fiestas Minervalias, main propaganda event of president Estrada Cabrera. However, the author of the lyrics of the National Anthem was still in the dark; between 1896 and 1910, Guatemalans were intrigued about the anonymous contributor that won the contest in 1897; but the enigma was over when Palma Lasso -already in his death bed- confessed that he was the famous «Anónymous»; he had not signed with his name given that he was part of the jury in 1897. In the 1910 Fiestas Minervalias the government awarded him with a prize and on 23 July 1911, Guatemalan intellectuals and president Manuel Estrada Cabrera, crown him with a silver laurel crown in his residence.

== Death ==
«That a government delegation present the most heartfelt salute to the family of the distinguished poet;
That the Secretaries of the Interior and of Foreign Affairs send invitations for the transport of the remains to the general Cemetery;
That the funeral be attended by government officials and cabinet members;
That the ceremonial speech be in chart of the Secretary of Foreign Affairs
That all the funeral expenses be paid the Guatemalan government.»

— Manuel Estrada Cabrera
President of Guatemala

By early August 1911, Palm was agonizing; his children took care of him until the very last moment -especially Zoila América Ana, who has his inseparable companion- and died at his home on 2 August 1911. A large crowd came to present the respects and to say goodbye to the poet; his remains were covered with the Cuban flag -given that he was the Cuban consul at the time of his death-. His funeral took place at 10:00 am on 3 August; doctor Luis Toledo Herrarte pronounced a speech in representation of the government and Arturo Ubico Urruela, president of Congress, spoke about the terrible loss and how his adoptive country had loved the poet very much. Finally, Rafael Arévalo Martínez wrote a poem in his honor.

== Monuments and ceremonies in his honor ==
- Theater "José Joaquin Palma", Calle "Carlos Manuel de Céspedes" #172 e/ Perucho Figueredo y Lora, Bayamo, Cuba was named in his honor.
- On 2 September 1944, general Federico Ponce Vaides, then interim president of Guatemala, issued an extraordinary decree to celebrate Palma's Centennial, however, the political situation Guatemala was going through at the time -after the resignation of general Jorge Ubico- did not permit the ceremonies to go as planned. On 11 September 1944, only the Universidad Nacional held a ceremony in their building, by invitation of doctor Carlos Federico Mora, president of the University. Doctor Calixto García, business attaché of Cuba in Guatemala, was the guest of honor, David Vela gave the ceremonial speech and José Joaquín Palma, grandson of the poet spoke on his behalf. Then, on the house #27 on the 10 E. street, where Palma died in 1911, both Cuban and Guatemalan national anthems were played and a commemorative plaques was unveiled.
- Carlos Prío Socarrás government in Cuba declared the house where Palma Lasso was born as a Cuban National Monument in 1951.

=== Return of his remains to Cuba ===
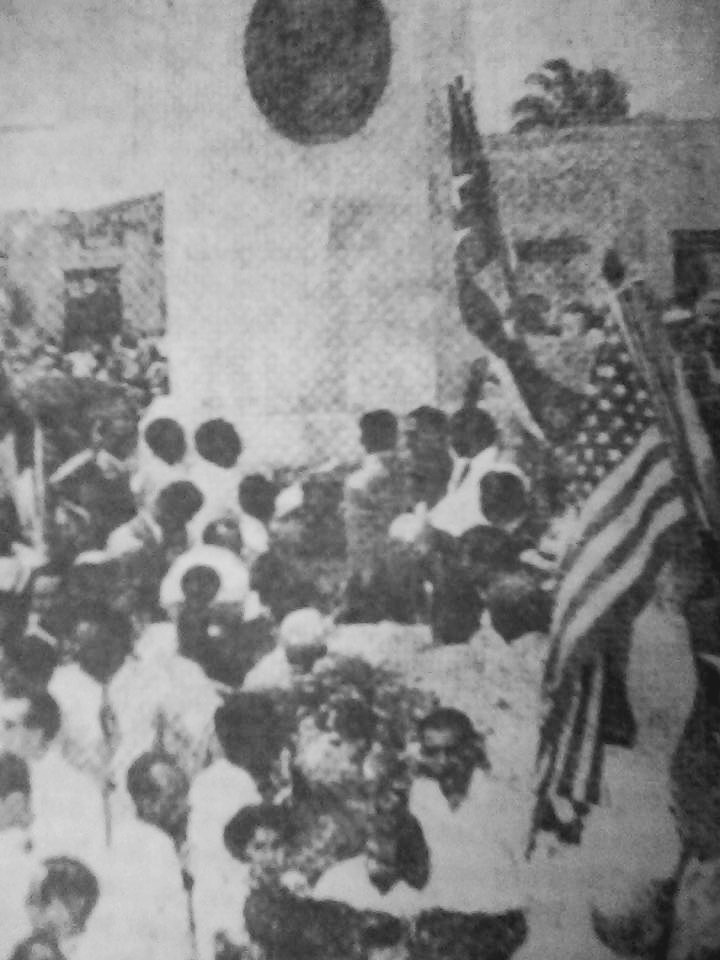
Palma funeral ceremony in Bayamo, Cuba, 1951.

In 1951, Cuban president Carlos Prío Socarrás requested Guatemalan president Jacobo Árbenz the return of Palma's remains to Cuba; upon learning that Palma's family agreed to this, Árbenz asked his Secretary of Foreign Affairs and Secretary of Education to take care of the ceremonies.

On 16 April 1951, after his remains were incinerated in presence of his family, Cuban Ambassador and a commission of the Guatemalan government, the urn was placed on an artillery cart of the Guatemalan Army and taken to Congress, where it remained for 24 hours, while it had a Guard of Honor of the President and his cabinet, representative to Congress, diplomats, Army cadets, school delegations, teachers, member of the Guatemalan Society of Geography and History, journalist and intellectuals. Doctor Raúl Roa Garcia, director of Culture the Cuban government, made the ceremonial speech and a student choral group sang the anthems of Cuba and Guatemala, and, for the first time, the Hymn to "José Joaquín Palma", composed by Raúl Marchena. To end the ceremony, a bronze plaque with the signatures of Palma Lasso and Rafael Alrez Ovalle – who composed the music the Guatemalan Anthem – was unveiled.

The next day, 17 April, in a ceremony in Congress, colonel Alfredo Lima and doctor Aureliano Sánchez Arango, pronounce a eulogy of Palma Lasso, and stressed the love that he had for his adoptive country, Guatemala. Zoila América Ana Palma de Figueroa, daughter of the poet was in attendance for this ceremony, which ended with a speech by representative Marco Antonio Villamar Contreras, who bid farewell to Palma in the name of the people of Guatemala. Immediately after, his remains were lifted by the Secretaries of Education of both Cuba and Guatemala, doctor Sánchez Arango and Héctor Morgan García, respectively and by the President of Congress and the Secretary of Foreign Affairs of Guatemala, Manuel Galich and the general public sang the original Guatemalan Anthem lyrics as they were written by Palma; then, the urn was placed on a military jeep and transported to La Aurora International Airport escorted by Army Cadets.

Once at the cemetery, Morgan García, officially gave the remains to the Cuban delegation. At 1:15 pm, five Cuban airplanes took off back to Cuba, and were escorted by a Guatemalan plane formation to the Atlantic coast.

Cuban president Carlos Prío Socarrás, his cabinet, diplomats, military commanders, journalist, school children, teachers and other guests received Palma's urn at the Rancho Boyeros military airport. Thousand of children with both Guatemala and Cuba flags walked alongside the urn until it was placed in the Hall of the Lost Steps and the government declared national mourning on 17 and 18 April. Palma was awarded the titles of "Bayamo's best son" and "Major general of the Cuban Army".

== Notes and references ==
=== Bibliography ===
- Arévalo Martínez, Rafael (1914). Los atormentados (in Spanish). Unión Tipográfica.
- Azcuy Alón, Fanny (1948). José Joaquín Palma - Toda Una Vida (in Spanish). La Habana, Cuba: Academia de la Historia de Cuba.
- Bonilla Ruano, José María (1935). Anotaciones críticodidácticas sobre el poema del himno nacional de Guatemala (in Spanish). Guatemala: Unión tipográfica.
- Carrera Mejía, Mynor (n.d.). Las Fiestas de Minerva en Guatemala, 1899-1919: El ansia de progreso y de civilización de los liberales (in Spanish). Costa Rica: Universidad de Costa Rica. Archived from the original on 2015-06-01.
- Fernández de Castro, José A. (1949). 'Esquema Histórico de las letras en Cuba (1548-1902) (in Spanish). La Habana, Cuba: Departamento de Intercambio Cultural de la Universidad de la Habana.
- Gamboa, Federico (1910). Gómez de la Puente, Eusebio (ed.). "Mi diario, primera serie" (PDF). scans.library.utoronto.ca (in Spanish). México: La Europea. Archived from the original (PDF) on 2015-06-04.
- Gobierno de Guatemala (1902). Álbum de Minerva 1902 (in Spanish). Vol. IV. Guatemala: Tipografía Nacional.
- Instituto de Literatura y Lingüística de la Academia de Ciencias de Cuba (1984). Diccionario de la Literatura Cubana (in Spanish). Vol. II. La Habana, Cuba: Letras Cubanas.
- Lazo, Raimundo (1965). La Literatura Cubana (in Spanish). México: Universidad Nacional Autónoma de México.
- La Ilustración Guatemalteca (1897). "Don Rafael Alvarez". La Ilustración Guatemalteca (in Spanish). 1 (17). Guatemala: Síguere, Guirola y Cía.: 249.
- Lezama Lima, José (1965). Antología de la Poesía Cubana - Tomo II (in Spanish). La Habana, Cuba: Consejo Nacional de Cultura.
- Mendoza, Juan M. (1946). Enrique Gómez Carrillo; Estudio Crítico-Biográfico: su vida, su obra y su época (in Spanish) (2nd ed.). Guatemala: Tipografía Nacional.
- Orgullo Guatemalteco (2014). "José Joaquín Palma". Orgullo guatemalteco (in Spanish). Guatemala. Archived from the original on 15 August 2014.
- Remos, Juan J. (1958). Proceso Histórico de las Letras Cubanas (in Spanish). Madrid, Spain: Ediciones Guadarrama, S.L.

=== Works of Palma Lasso ===
- Palma, José Joaquín (1882). Ramón Rosa (ed.). Poesías (in Spanish). Tegucigalpa, Honduras: Tipografía Nacional.
- —; Álvarez Ovalle, Rafael (1935). Himno nacional de Guatemala (in Spanish). Guatemala: Unión Tipográfica.
