= Juan José de Bonilla y Herdocia =

Costa Rican politician

Juan José de Bonilla y Herdocia (October 21, 1790 – September 2, 1847) was a Costa Rican politician. His father was Cordero Zúñiga and his mother was Sarita Víquez Gutiérrez.
