= Yarimar Bonilla =

Puerto Rican political anthropologist, author

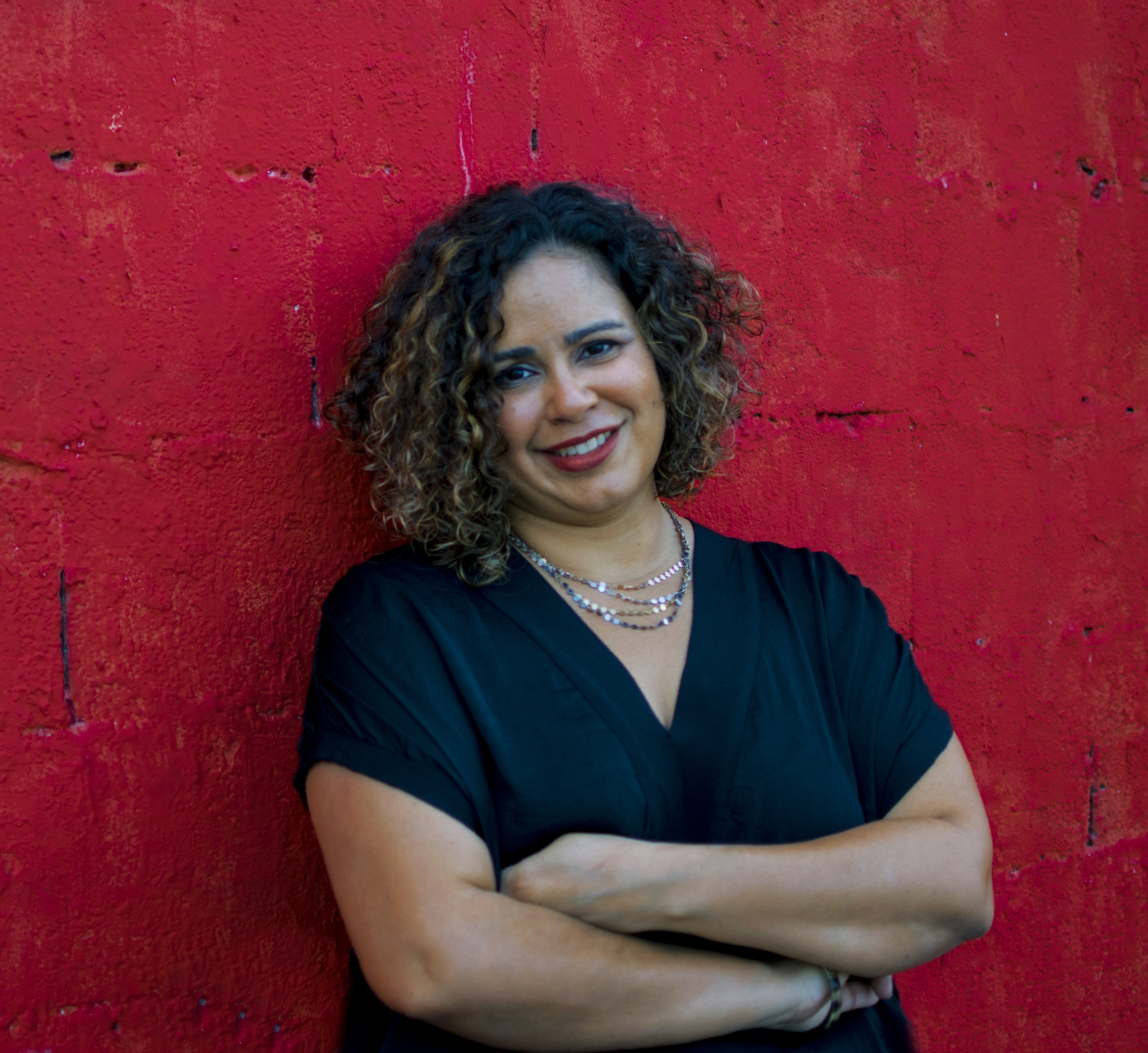
- Born: February 23, 1975 (age 51); San Juan, Puerto Rico
- Occupations: Political anthropologist, author, columnist, and Professor of Anthropology and Puerto Rican Studies

Yarimar Bonilla (born February 23, 1975) is a Puerto Rican political anthropologist, author, columnist, and professor of anthropology and Puerto Rican studies at Hunter College and the Graduate Center of the City University of New York. As of 1 July 2023 she is a Professor at Princeton's Effron Center. Bonilla’s research questions the nature of sovereignty and relationships of citizenship and race across the Americas.

== Education ==
Born in San Juan, Puerto Rico, Bonilla received her bachelor’s degree in social sciences from the University of Puerto Rico- Rio Piedras with a concentration in Caribbean studies in 1996. She then obtained her master’s degree in Latin American studies from the University of New Mexico in 1998 and her Ph.D. from The University of Chicago in 2008.

== Career ==
Bonilla’s work bridges historical and political anthropology and has been published widely in English, Spanish, and French. She was Assistant Professor of Anthropology at the University of Virginia from 2008-2011. She was then Assistant Professor (2011-2015) and Associate Professor (2015-2018) of Anthropology and Latino/Caribbean Studies at Rutgers University. As of 2018, she is Professor of Africana and Puerto Rican/Latino Studies at Hunter College, CUNY and the Ph.D. Program in Anthropology at the CUNY Graduate Center.

=== Recognition ===
Bonilla has received numerous grants and awards, including from the Wenner Gren Foundation, the National Science Foundation, the Carnegie Foundation, the Chateaubriand Fellowship Program, the Russell Sage Foundation, the Carter G. Woodson Institute for Afro-American and African Studies at the University of Virginia, the Schomburg Center for Research in Black Culture, and the W.E.B. Dubois Institute at Harvard University. She was named a 2018-19 Carnegie Fellow for her research on the social aftermath of Hurricane Maria in Puerto Rico. The Carnegie Fellowship supported Bonilla’s work on the book Aftershocks of Disaster (Haymarket Books, 2019).

== Published works ==
=== Academic articles ===
Bonilla'a articles have explored questions of coloniality, historicity, sovereignty, digital ethnography, racial politics, cartographic representation, and the politics of memory. She also released a series of articles between 2010 and 2015 focused on the political situation and sovereignty struggles in the French Caribbean island of Guadalupe.

(2010) “Guadeloupe is Ours” Interventions, 12: 1, 125 — 137

(2011) “The Past is Made by Walking: Labor Activism and Historical Production in Postcolonial Guadeloupe” Cultural Anthropology, Vol. 26, Issue 3, pp. 313–339

(2012) “Gwadloup Se Tan Nou! (Guadalupe es Nuestra): El Impacto de la Huelga General En el Imaginario Politico de las Antillas Francesas” Caribbean Studies Vol. 40, No. 1 (January - June 2012), 81-98

(2012) “Le syndicalisme comme marronage: epistemologies du travail et de l’histoire en Guadeloupe” Mobilisations sociales aux Antilles, pg 77-94

(2013) “Burning Questions: The Life and Work of Michel-Rolph Trouillot, 1949-2012” Nacla

(2013) “History Unchained (Reflections on ‘Lincoln’ and ‘Django Unchained’)” JSTOR 65.88.88.231

(2013) “Ordinary Sovereignty” Small Axe 42: 152-165

(2014) “Remembering the songwriter: The life and legacies of Michel-Rolph Troulliot” Cultural Dynamics Vol 26(2) 163-172

(2015) “#Ferguson: Digital Protest, Hashtag Ethnography, and the Racial Politics of Social Media in the United States” American Ethnologist Vol 00 No. 0: 4-16

(2015) “Fast Writing: Ethnography in the Digital Age” Antrhodendum

(2016) “Visualizing Sovereignty: Cartographic Queries for the Digital Age” Archipelagos

(2017) “Deprovincializing Trump, decolonizing diversity, and unsettling anthropology” American Ethnologist Vol 44, No 2: 201-208

Bonilla is currently Section Editor of Public Anthropologies for the journal American Anthropologist. Additionally, she serves on the editorial committee for Small Axe: A Caribbean Platform for Criticism.

=== Books ===
Bonilla’s first book, Non-Sovereign Futures: French Caribbean Politics in the Wake of Disenchantment investigates how modern activists in the French Caribbean island of Guadeloupe conceptualize and challenge the limits of postcolonial sovereignty. Contesting present-day concepts of nationalism, freedom, revolution, and sovereignty, Non-Sovereign Futures re-envisions Guadeloupe, and the entire Caribbean, not as a tumultuous non-sovereign region, but as a space that can disrupt how we think of sovereignty itself.

Bonilla’ second book project, Aftershocks of Disaster: Puerto Rico Before and After the Storm gives voice to many of those affected by Hurricane Maria. The book compiles the narratives of Puerto Rican journalists, poets, artists, and community leaders in order to show how Puerto Ricans seek to come to terms with not just the impact of Maria, but also the larger, deeper traumas produced by the island’s longer socio-political history and enduring colonialism. The book challenges readers to consider disaster not as an event, but rather as an ongoing process.

=== Digital projects ===
Bonilla is the co-designer for Visualizing Sovereignty: Animated Video of Caribbean Political History (2016) with Max Hantel. The video takes the viewer through the complex history of the Caribbean as it is ruled by Spain, the Netherlands, Denmark, France, the United Kingdom, and the United States through the 18th century. Using cartographic technology to visualize Caribbean political history, the project asks “How can we not just visualize sovereignty but use said visualizations to re-theorize the meaning of sovereignty itself?”

Bonilla is also the co-creator of the Puerto Rico Syllabus Project (#PRSyllabus) along with Marisol LeBrón, Sarah Molinari, and Isabel Guzzardo Tamargo. This digital humanities project of social scholarship provides open-access resources for teaching and learning about the intersecting socio-economic crises affecting Puerto Rico and how they are products of Puerto Rico’s complex colonial relationship with the United States. The Syllabus Wordpress site also connects users with groups and initiatives in Puerto Rico and the diaspora organizing around the debt crisis, student struggles, and Hurricane Maria recovery.
