= Juan Crisóstomo Bonilla =

Mexican general

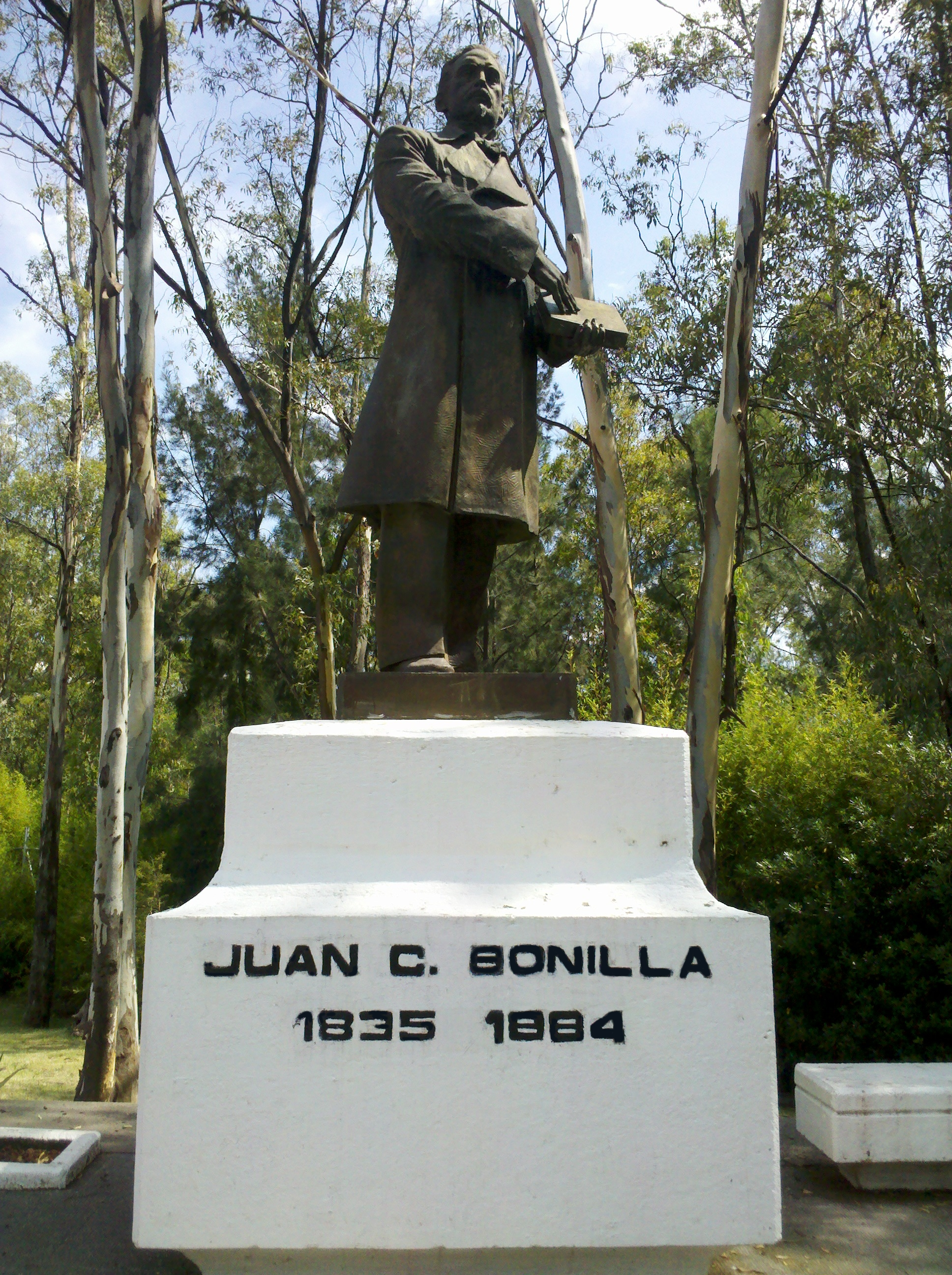
His statue in Puebla

Juan Crisóstomo Bonilla Pérez (27 January 1835 – 30 January 1884) was a Mexican general. He was born in Tetela de Ocampo, Puebla, and died in Veracruz.
