= Enrique Gómez Carrillo =

Guatemalan literary critic, writer, journalist and diplomat (1873–1927)

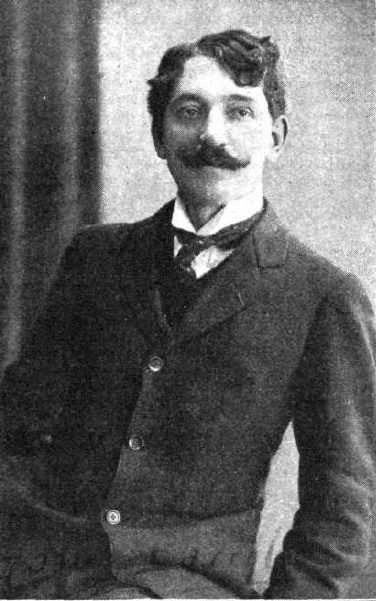
- Enrique Gómez Carrillo in Paris
- Born: February 27, 1873; Guatemala City, Guatemala
- Died: November 29, 1927 (aged 54); Paris, France
- Occupations: Diplomat, writer, journalist
- Spouse(s): Aurora Cáceres (1905-1906); Raquel Meller (1919-1920); Consuelo Suncín (1926-1927)
- Writing career
- Language: Spanish
- Period: 19th century – 20th century
- Notable works: Sensaciones de arte (1893); Literatura extranjera (1895); Tres novelas inmorales: Del amor, del dolor y del vicio (1898); El modernismo (1905); El alma encantadora de París (1902); La Rusia actual (1906); La Grecia eterna (1908); El Japón heroico y galante (1912); La sonrisa de la esfinge (1913); Jerusalén y la Tierra Santa (1914); Vistas de Europa (1919); Literaturas exóticas (1920); Safo, Friné y otras seductoras (1921); El misterio de la vida y de la muerte de Mata-Hari (1923); Las cien obras maestras de la literatura universal (1924); La nueva literatura francesa (1927).
- Notable awards: Montyon of the Académie Française (1906); Legion of Honour Cross
- Movement: Modernism

Enrique Gómez Carrillo (February 27, 1873 in Guatemala City – November 29, 1927 in Paris) was a Guatemalan literary critic, writer, journalist and diplomat, and the second husband of the Salvadoran-French writer and artist Consuelo Suncin de Sandoval-Cardenas, later Consuelo Suncin, comtesse de Saint-Exupéry, who in turn was his third wife; he had been previously married to intellectual Aurora Cáceres and Spanish actress Raquel Meller.

He also became famous for his travels, chronicles, bohemian lifestyle and his notoriously numerous love affairs. At one time he was falsely accused of being the one that betrayed Mata Hari and gave the famous German spy up to the French during World War I.

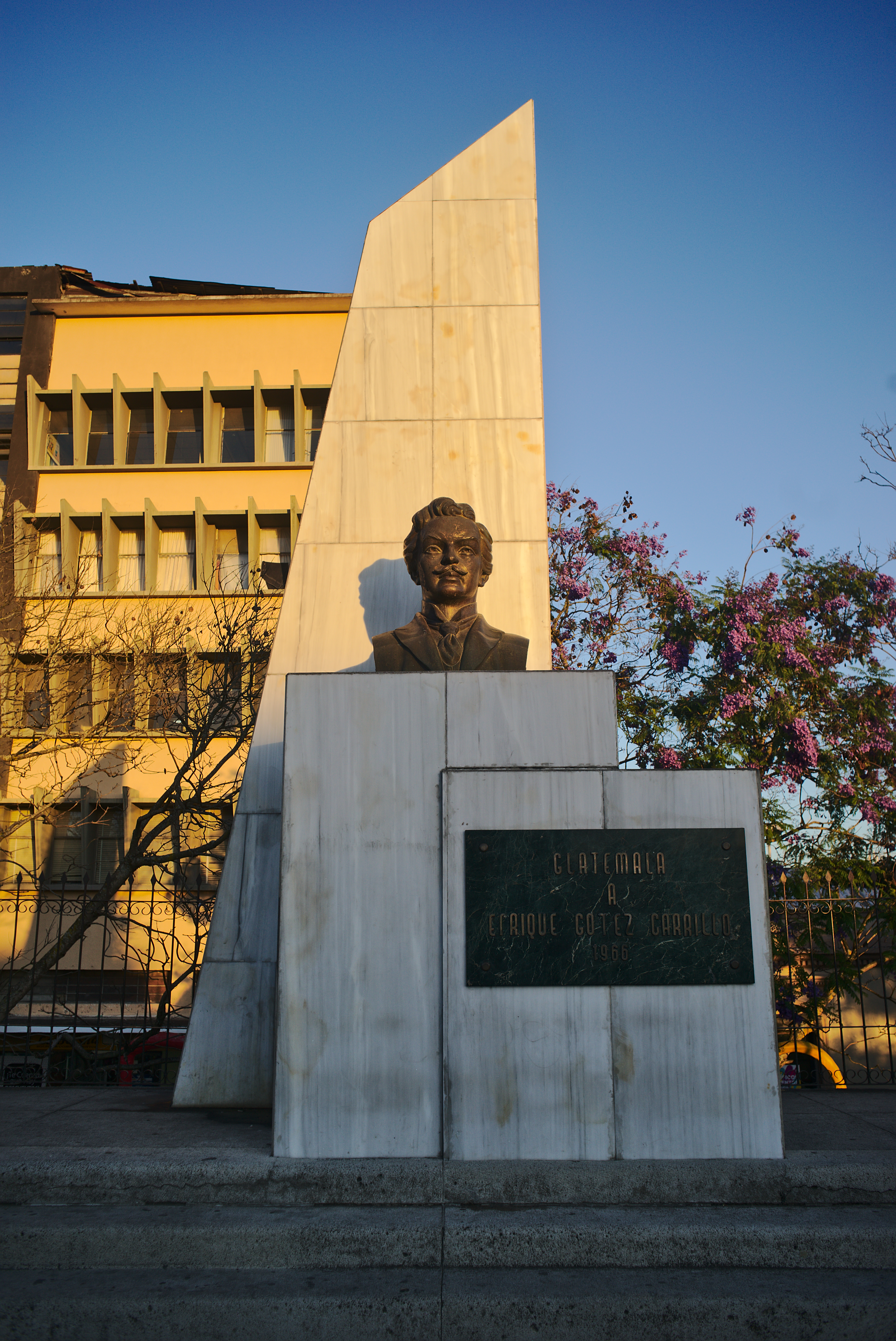
Enrique Gomez Carrillo statue at in Parque La Concordia, Guatemala City

== Biography ==
In 1891 Gómez Carrillo won a scholarship to study in Spain, from then President of Guatemala Manuel Lisandro Barillas. Before moving there, he went to Paris, where he met several writers, such as Paul Verlaine, Jean Moréas and Leconte de Lisle. He subsequently moved to France in 1892, becoming a journalist for a Spanish newspaper thanks to his close friend the Spanish writer Alfredo Vicenti and becoming acquainted with many Parisian literary figures such as James Joyce, Oscar Wilde and Émile Zola. The following year he published his first book, Esquisses, which includes profiles of several writers of the time, and contributed to several publications.

In 1898 he was back in Guatemala, and worked in the election campaign of interim president Manuel Estrada Cabrera, who rewarded him for his work by appointing him consul of Guatemala in Paris. Years later, the Argentine president Hipólito Yrigoyen also appointed him as a representative of Argentina. In 1895 he became a member of the Royal Spanish Academy. In France, he won several awards for his literary work; in 1906 he won the Montyon of the Académie Française for the French translation of his book The Japanese Soul. In 1916 he was made a Knight of the Legion of Honor, and later promoted to Commander in the same order.

=== Journalism career ===
Ever since his arrival in Europe, Gómez Carrillo sent his critical and opinion articles to El Liberal, a prestigious Spanish newspaper.

==== Press correspondent ====
Among the journalists in Europe there were very few that could match him, so that he came to be known as "Prince of the Chroniclers". His massive work production is not known in its entirety because he worked for a lot of different news outlets throughout his life; the most famous were:

1. Buenos Aires, Argentina: La Nación and La Razón
2. La Habana, Cuba: Diario de La Marina
3. Madrid, Spain: El Liberal -with two thousand six hundred sixty seven articles from 1899 to 1920-, Blanco y Negro, La Esfera, Pluma y Lápiz, Electra, El Imparcial and ABC -with five hundrerd seventy articles from 1921 to 1927-.

Among his major contributions were:

1. A report about Tsarist Russia in 1905. During a trip to Saint Petersburg along with Alfredo Vincenti, director of El Liberal, he got to know first hand the tremendous reality of Tsar Nicholas II, the orthodox clergy, the student and worker movements, and the officials and nobles repression. After appearing in El Liberal, his news reports were reprinted in his book La Rusia Actual, -The current Russia with an introduction by Alfredo Vicenti. This book was the strongest denounce against the injustices in Russia written in Spanish. Given that it was not written by a politician or a government, it was regarded as an objective and unbiased analysis.
2. Egypt, Japan and China, also in 1905. After the victory of the Empire of Japan over the Russians, Gómez Carrillo convinced the director of the newspapers for whom he worked to allow him to visit the Far East. The voyage's goal was to inform the readers of El Liberal and La Nación about what was going on in Japan after its victory, the consequence of the war and what was the path of this powerful empire, but his notes not only talk about politics and the social customs of those countries; they also talk about the erotic customs and traditions of those places. His work appeared in two books:
  - De Marsella a Tokio, sensaciones de Egipto, la India, la China y el Japón (From Marseille to Tokio, sensations of Egypt, Indian, China and Japan) published in 1906 with an introduction written by Rubén Darío.
  - El Alma Japonesa (The Japanese soul) published in 1907 and dedicated to the President of Guatemala, Manuel Estrada Cabrera for making "the worship of public instruction a modern religion". When this book was translated into French, the government of France granted him the Cross of the Legion of Honor "due to his long, persevering and magnificent propaganda work about the French literary works and culture".
3. Holy Land: after a trip by the Holy Land in 1913, Gómez Carrillo wrote his book Jerusalén y la Tierra Santa (Jerusalem and the Holy Land), which was very well received by the literary critics, but blasted by the religious groups. However, despite the religious criticism, the book was a best-seller in both Spain and Latin America. He was excommunicated by several bishops in both continents, but it was Rubén Darío who summarizes best who triumphed in the end: "it is the firmest, most heartfelt and most thought after of all of his work... if this devil of a man wanted, even after the excommunication, a cardinal would write introductions for his books!"
4. World War I: during the first three years of World War I, he worked as press correspondent of El Liberal, and thanks to his detailed chronicles, which came from his courage of getting close to enemy lines, the Spanish readers got to know the horrors of the front. A summary of his articles is found in his books: Crónica de la Guerra (War Chronicles, 1915), Reflejos de la Tragedia (Reflections of the Tragedy, 1915), En las Trincheras (Inside the trenches, 1916), and En el Corazón de la Tragedia (At the heart of the tragedy, 1916), among others.

For his war contributions, the French government granted him the high dignity of Commentator of the Legion of Honor. He was also a skilled interviewer, and his most famous one was with pope Benedict XV during the war; the Pope accepted to be interviewed by Gómez Carrillo in spite of being a well-known playboy and a heretic writer. In 1916 was appointed as El Liberal director, but could work in that position for a year due to his multiple travels as press correspondent.

==== Magazines ====
In 1907 he began published the magazine El Nuevo Mercurio (The new Mercury, which had first class contributions from the best Latin American writers: besides Gómez Carrillo, it had material from Catulle Mendès, Jean Moréas, Rubén Darío, José María Vargas Vila, Miguel de Unamuno, Manuel Ugarte, Amado Nervo, and others. Unfortunately, and despite the quality of its material, the magazine had to close because it did not appeal to the readers.

=== Wives and famous romances ===
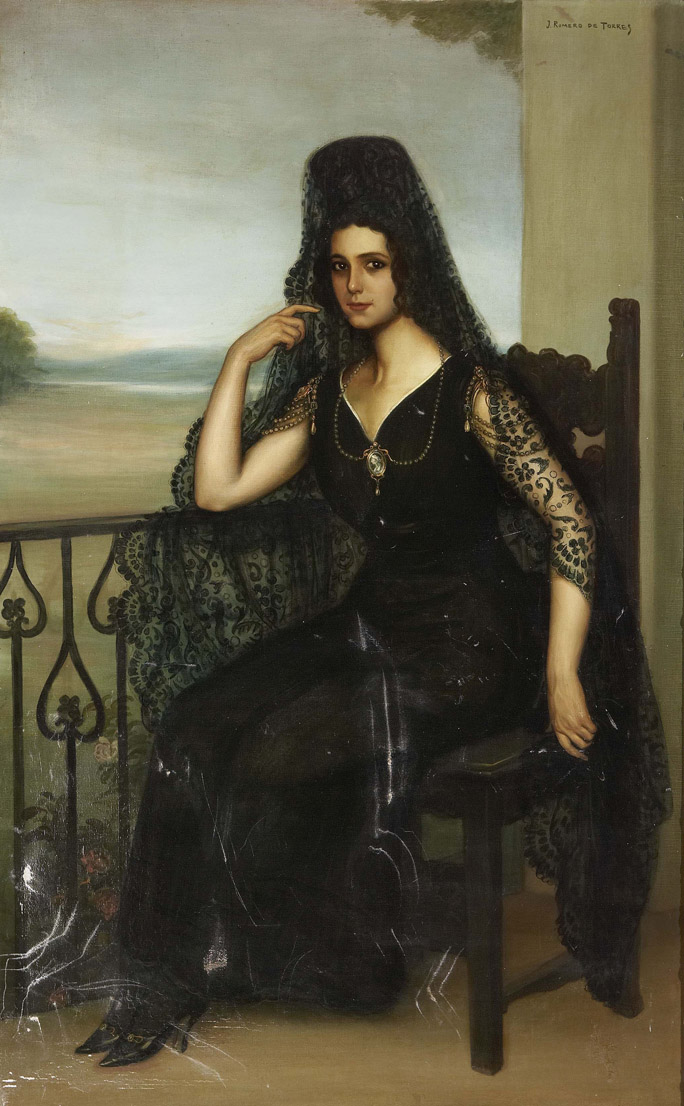
Raquel Meller, Spanish singer and actress. Gómez Carrillo's second wife (1919-1920). Julio Romero de Torres painting.

Given his intellectual and physical strengths, Gómez Carrillo was very popular with women, having a long list of affairs with artists, writers, and French socialites. However, there were a handful of ladies that were able -at least for a short while- keep him for themselves:

- Alice Freville: French socialite, «charming, smart and very literate» with whom Gómez Carrillo lived a torrid romance when he arrived to Paris for the first time and then when he went to Madrid. Even though they split in 1902, he used to visit her when he was stressed out and he always looked after her, until her death.
- Aurora Cáceres: Peruvian feminist writer, daughter of the former President of Peru general Andrés Avelino Cáceres. They got married on June 6, 1906, but his constant mood swings and the unfamiliar Parisian ambiance, the marriage did not last and they split in April 1907. She later described her life with the writer in her book Mi vida con Enrique Gómez Carrillo -My life with Enrique Gómez Carrillo-. In the book one can feel that she was aloof and that disliked the continuous parties and tourist trips who rather stayed reading at home. She was such a loner, that she like to have two single beds instead of a couples one.

Our marriage was so distant that in an argument we reacted as this: he, with courteous distancing and I with marked and fake coldeness.

— Aurora Cáceres
- Raquel Meller: in 1917, Gómez Carrillo met the Spanish flamenco singer, who married him in 1919 after he wooed her in his writings. But then, his condition showed the life of excess he had led: his constant drinking binges and infidelities caused a lot of tension in the marriage. But everything collapsed when Raquel learned that he was wasting away her hard earned money. After a public ugly argument about their finances, they divorced in 1920.

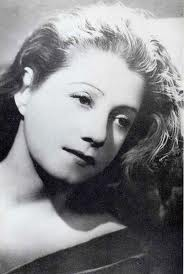
Consuelo Suncín Gómez Carrillo's third wife (1926-1927).

- Consuelo Suncín: French-Salvadorian writer, who studied Literature and Law in México. She travelled to Paris along to her protector, José Vasconcelos. Once in Paris, she fell in love with Gómez Carrillo and married him in 1926, becoming his widow just eleven months later, when he died of a stroke.

==== Mata Hari scandal ====
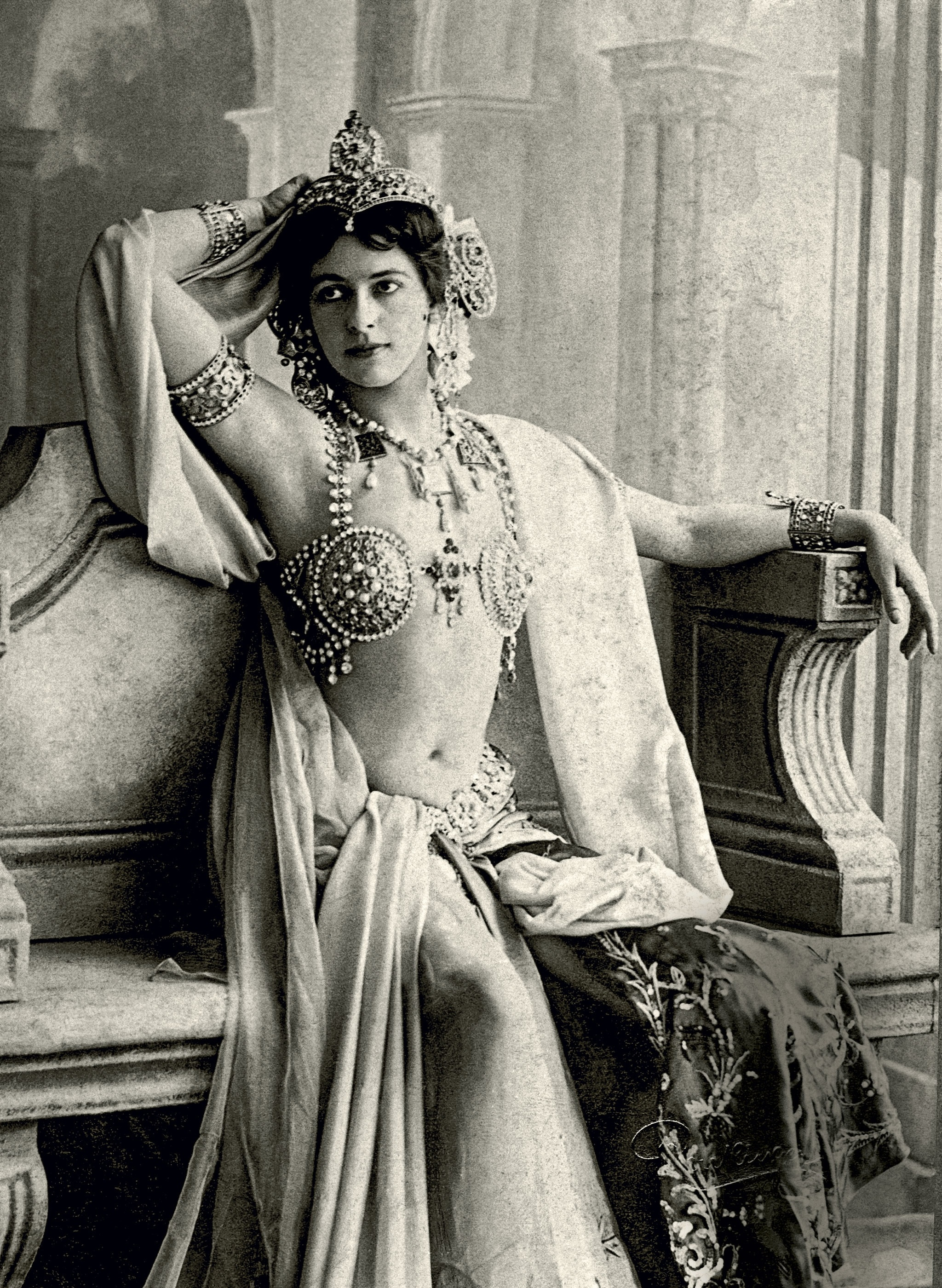
Mata Hari, famous exotic dancer and German spy during World War I. At the time, Gómez Carrillo was falsely accused of being the one who betrayed her and gave her to the French authorities.

Mata Hari was a famous exotic dancer, who was accused of espionage and then shot by French authorities due to her ties to the German secret services during World War I. Later on, admiral Wilhelm Canaris, German secret service director, wrote in his autobiography that it was he who betrayed Mata Hari and that he did it because her services were no longer needed. At the time, a rumor that Gómez Carrillo and his wife Raquel Meller were the ones that told the French on Mata Hari -even though at the time Gómez Carrillo had not even met Raquel yet-; Gómez Carrillo took advantage of the scandal to increase his fame and prestige, and even wrote a book on it: El Misterio de la Vida y de la Muerte de Mata Hari -The mystery of Mata Hari's life and death-.

Maurice Maeterlinck described Gómez Carrillo as a "true Renaissance man", living his life to the extreme as a relentless dueler, syphilitic, traveller and correspondent. He died on November 29, 1927, and is buried in Paris's Père Lachaise Cemetery; years later, when Consuelo died, she was buried alongside him; upon his death, she inherited his two homes in Paris and Cimiez, near Nice.

== Death ==
Gómez Carrillo died in Paris on 27 November 1927, victim of an aneurysm following years of excess, and is buried in Père Lachaise Cemetery. Next to him are the remains of his last wife, Consuelo, who had become countess of Saint-Exupéry after her third marriage, to French pilot and writer Antoine de Saint-Exupéry.

=== Monument in Guatemala City ===
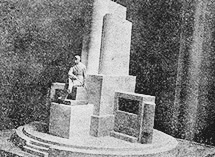
Original draft of the monument to Gómez Carrillo.

On 9 July 1941, by initiative of Nicaraguan writer Juan Manuel Mendoza, who wrote Gómez Carrillo's biography, a Committee pro Enrique Gómez Carrillo Monument was created, and it was in charge of Natalia Górriz de Morales. Among those who worked with the committee were Miguel Ángel Asturias and Federico Hernández de León, who put at the committee's service the Diario del Aire broadcasts, and Nuestro Diario newspaper, respectively. Finally, during Dr. Juan José Arévalo presidency, in 1947 the monument was opened to the public in Concordia square, which was renamed as Enrique Gómez Carrillo Park.

=== Monument in Guatemala City General Cemetery ===
In 1960 a tomb for those famous Guatemalan intellectuals that had died overseas was built in the Guatemala City General Cemetery Unfortunately, due to the coup d'état of 1963 that deposed general Miguel Ydígoras Fuentes, President of Guatemala and sponsor of this idea, the project was abandoned; only Antonio José de Irisarri -who died in New York City in 1868 and whose remains were taken back to Guatemala in 1968- and poet Domingo Estrada -who died in Paris in 1901- are buried in the tomb. In the case of Gómez Carrillo, due to the impossibility of getting his remains, his name was inscribed on a plaque in bronze letters. By the end of the 20th century, all the bronze letters had been stolen, the plaque covered with graffiti and the whole place is totally abandoned.

== Literary works ==
Gómez Carrillo became the author of nearly eighty books of various genres, and is known primarily for his chronicles (crónicas), characterized by modernist prose.

He contributed to numerous publications in Spain, France and Latin America, and headed El Nuevo Mercurio (1907) and Cosmópolis (1919–1922). Gómez Carrillo lived mainly in Madrid and Paris. It was in Madrid where he decided to change his surname from "Gomez Tible" to "Gómez Carrillo," mortified by the joking of others. A tireless traveler, he wrote numerous chronicles that collected his impressions of the places he visited: the enchanting París (1902), La Rusia actual (1906), La Grecia eterna (1908), El Japón heroico y galante (1912), La sonrisa de la esfinge (1913), Jerusalén y la Tierra Santa (1914) and Vistas de Europa (1919).

He was also the author of several essays, autobiographies and literary criticisms on "Art Sensation" (1893) "Foreign Literature" (1895), "Modernism" (1905), "Exotic literatures" (1920), "Sappho, and other seductive courtesans" (1921), "The mystery of life and death of Mata Hari" (1923), "The hundred masterpieces of world literature" (1924) and "New French literature" (1927).

As for his narrative, immoral novels include Of love, of pain and vice (1898), Bohemia sentimental (1899), Wonderland (1899, 1922) and The Gospel of Love (1922). Erotic themes predominate within the aesthetic decadence of his writings.

=== Forgotten in Guatemala ===
Guatemala is probably the country where Gómez Carrillo is least known, and where the few that know about his work are those who criticize it the most. Official the cultural curriculum has ignored him, neglecting both his persona and his work. Luis Cardoza y Aragón, has been the direct culprit of this; in both of his memoirs Cardoza y Aragón wrote complete chapters about Gómez Carrillo where he attacks the writer mercilessly. Cardoza's criticism, however, cannot completely hide his resentment and envy toward the writer who visited him in Paris in his youth, and to whom he dedicated his very first book of poetry.

It was not until the 21st century that a collection about representative writers in the American continent published a chapter explaining the deliberate neglect around Gómez Carrillo's memory in his home country. The chapter states that: "Ever since Darío died in 1916 there has been a lot of books about modernism. Generally, they ignore Gómez Carrillo. This musketeer winner in life has not escaped the destiny of those who indulge in their excesses. Besides, he lacked something critical to accomplish immediate celebrity: loved relatives and a protector government.» Further along, the chapter says: "[...] in Guatemala, asking about Gómez Carrillo, nobody had any information. His own brother, a language professor, carries along completely oblivious to his brother's glory [...] and the bookstores do not have any of his works [...] it is easier to find them in Buenos Aires and in Madrid, for sure."

In Spain, in the 2010s, there has been a renewed interest in Gómez Carrillo's works; some of his best books have been reprinted and starting in 2014 -with the centennial of World War I- there have been printings of several books with the articles that he wrote about the war for El Liberal of Madrid and La Nación of Buenos Aires.

== See also ==
- Consuelo de Saint-Exupéry
- Manuel Estrada Cabrera
- Raquel Meller

== Notes and references ==
=== Bibliography ===
- Alemán Bolaños, G. (May 22, 1953). "Odisea de Consuelito Suncín, la última esposa de Gómez Carrillo" (in Spanish). Guatemala.
- Cáceres, Aurora (1929). Mi Vida con Enrique Gómez Carrillo (in Spanish). Madrid: Co. Iberoamericana de Publicaciones.
- Diario de Centro América (July 16, 1941). "Organización del Comité Pro-monumento a Enrique Gómez Carrillo". Diario de Centro América (in Spanish). Archived from the original on June 14, 2015.
- Mendoza, Juan Manuel (1946). Enrique Gómez Carrillo, estudio crítico-biográfico: su vida, su obra y su época (in Spanish) (2nd ed.). Guatemala: Tipografía Nacional.
- Naval, E. (March 31, 1930). "La vida amorosa de Gómez Carrillo". El Imparcial (in Spanish). Guatemala.
- Navarrete Cáceres, Carlos (2001). "Evidencias arqueológicas en el Cementerio General de la ciudad de Guatemala". Anales de la Academia de Geografía e Historia de Guatemala (in Spanish). LXXVI. Guatemala.
- Rivera, Luis Eduardo (June 28, 2015). "Al rescate de Gómez Carrillo" (in Spanish). Guatemala. Archived from the original on June 29, 2015.
- Schiff, Stacy (1996) [1994]. Saint-Exupéry: A Biography (Reprinted ed.). New York: de Capo. ISBN 978-0-8050-7913-5.
- Torres Espinoza, Enrique (2007). Enrique Gómez Carrillo, el cronista errante (in Spanish) (2nd ed.). Guatemala: F&G. ISBN 9789992261569.
- Webster, Paul (June 24, 2000). "Flying into a literary storm: Antoine de Saint-Exupéry, author of The Little Prince, was born 100 years ago. The celebrations, however, have been marred by his widow's bitter account of their marriage". The Guardian. London.

=== Works of Gómez Carrillo ===
- Gómez Carrillo, Enrique (1898). Manuel Estrada Cabrera. Club Constitución (in Spanish). Guatemala: Síguere and Co.
- — (1900). Almas and cerebros: historias sentimentales, intimidades parisienses, etc (in Spanish). París: Garnier Hnos.
- — (1906). La Rusia actual (in Spanish). París: Garnier Hnos.
- — (1906). Maravillas, novela funambulesca (in Spanish). París and Ciudad de México: Librería de la viudad de Ch. Bouret.
- —; Darío, Rubén (1906). De Marsella a Tokio, sensaciones de Egipto, la India, la China and el Japón (in Spanish). París, France: Garnier Hnos.
- — (1907). El alma japonesa (in Spanish). París: Garnier Hnos.
- — (1909). La Grecia eterna (in French). París: Perrit et. Cie.
- — (1912). El Japón Heroico and Galante (in Spanish). Madrid, Spain: Renacimiento.
- — (1913). Romerías (in Spanish). París, France: Garnier Hnos.
- — (1917). In the heart of the tragedy. London, New York and Toronto: Garnier Hodder and Stoughton.
- — (1918). Treinta años de mi vida; El despertar del alma (in Spanish). Vol. 1. Buenos Aires, Argentina: Casa Vaccaro.
- — (1919). Vistas de Europa (in Spanish). Madrid, Spain: Mundo Latino.
- — (1921). El encanto de Buenos Aires (in Spanish). Madrid, Spain: Mundo Latino.
- — (1922). El evangelio del Amor (in Spanish). Madrid, Spain: Mundo Latino.
- —. Campo de Batalla and Campos de Ruinas (in Spanish). Spain: Ediciones del Viento. Archived from the original on March 4, 2016.
- —. Pequeñas historias de la Gran Guerra (in Spanish). Libros de la Ballena.
- —. La teta and la maleta (in Spanish). Libros de la Ballena.
