= List of international presidential trips made by Tsai Ing-wen =

This is a list of international presidential trips made by Tsai Ing-wen, the 7th president of Taiwan, who served from 2016 to 2024.

== Summary ==
The number of visits per country where she travelled are:

- One visit to: Panama, Honduras, Nicaragua, El Salvador, Tuvalu, Solomon Islands, Eswatini, Palau, Nauru, Haiti, Saint Kitts and Nevis, Saint Vincent and the Grenadines, Saint Lucia.
- Two visits to: Paraguay, Guatemala, Belize, Marshall Islands.
- Ten visits to: the United States.

== 2016 ==
	Dates	Country	Locations	Details
1	24 June	United States	Miami	Tsai stopped in Miami, Florida to deliver remarks at a banquet with Taiwanese expatriates.
1	24–25 June	Panama	Panama City	Tsai made her first presidential visit to Panama to celebrate the Panama Canal Expansion. Also attended a ceremony for donation of flu medicine to Panama, a ceremony of the signing of a cooperative agreement on immigration affairs and human trafficking prevention, and a state banquet with President Juan Carlos Varela.
1	30 June–1 July	Paraguay	Asunción	Tsai made her presidential visit to Paraguay, including delivering an address before the National Congress of Paraguay and a state banquet with President Horacio Cartes.
1	1–2 July	United States	Los Angeles	Transit. Held a telephone call with then-House Speaker Paul Ryan.

== 2017 ==
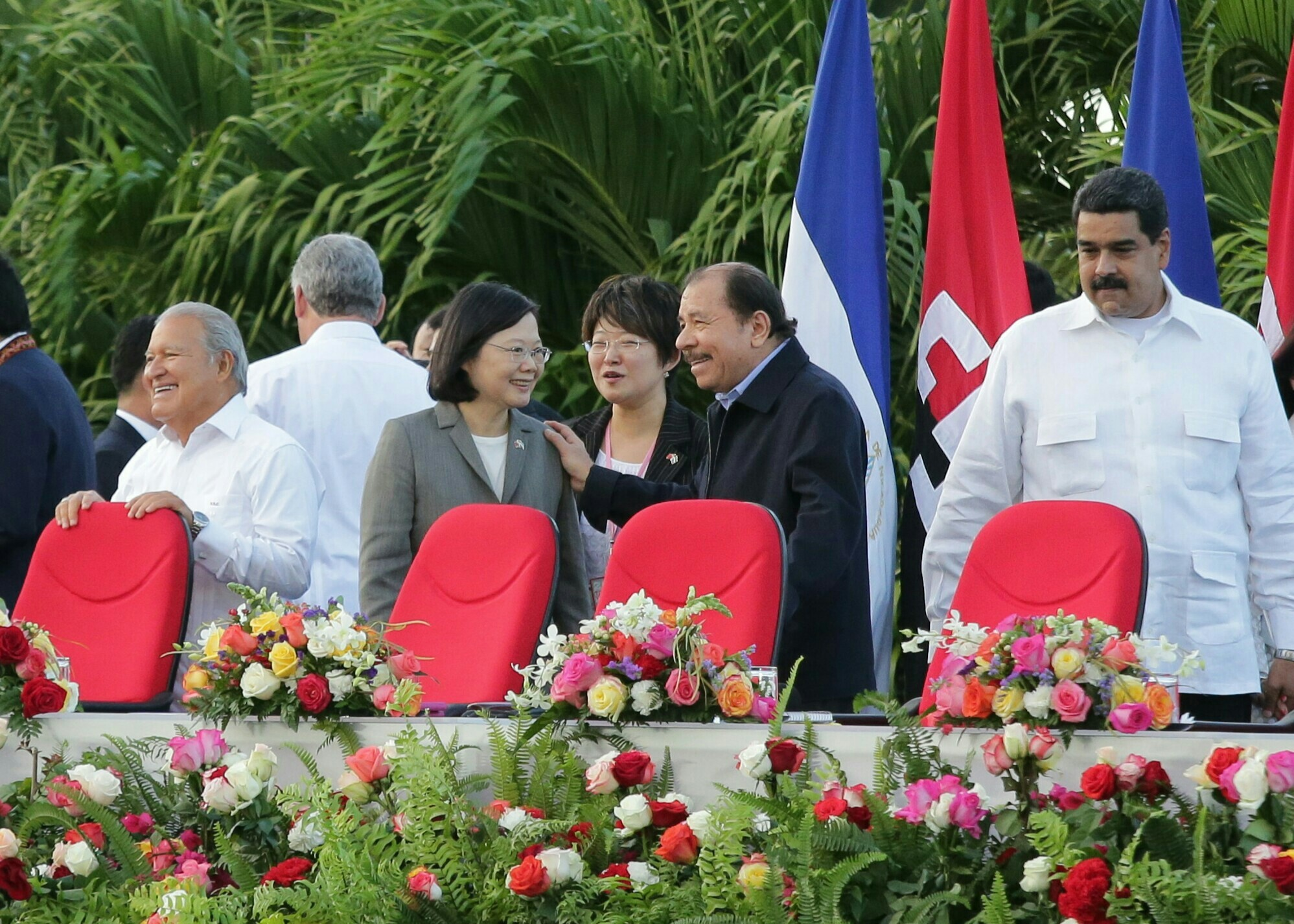
Tsai with Nicaraguan President Daniel Ortega, Venezuelan President Nicolás Maduro and Salvadoran President Salvador Sánchez Cerén in January 2017

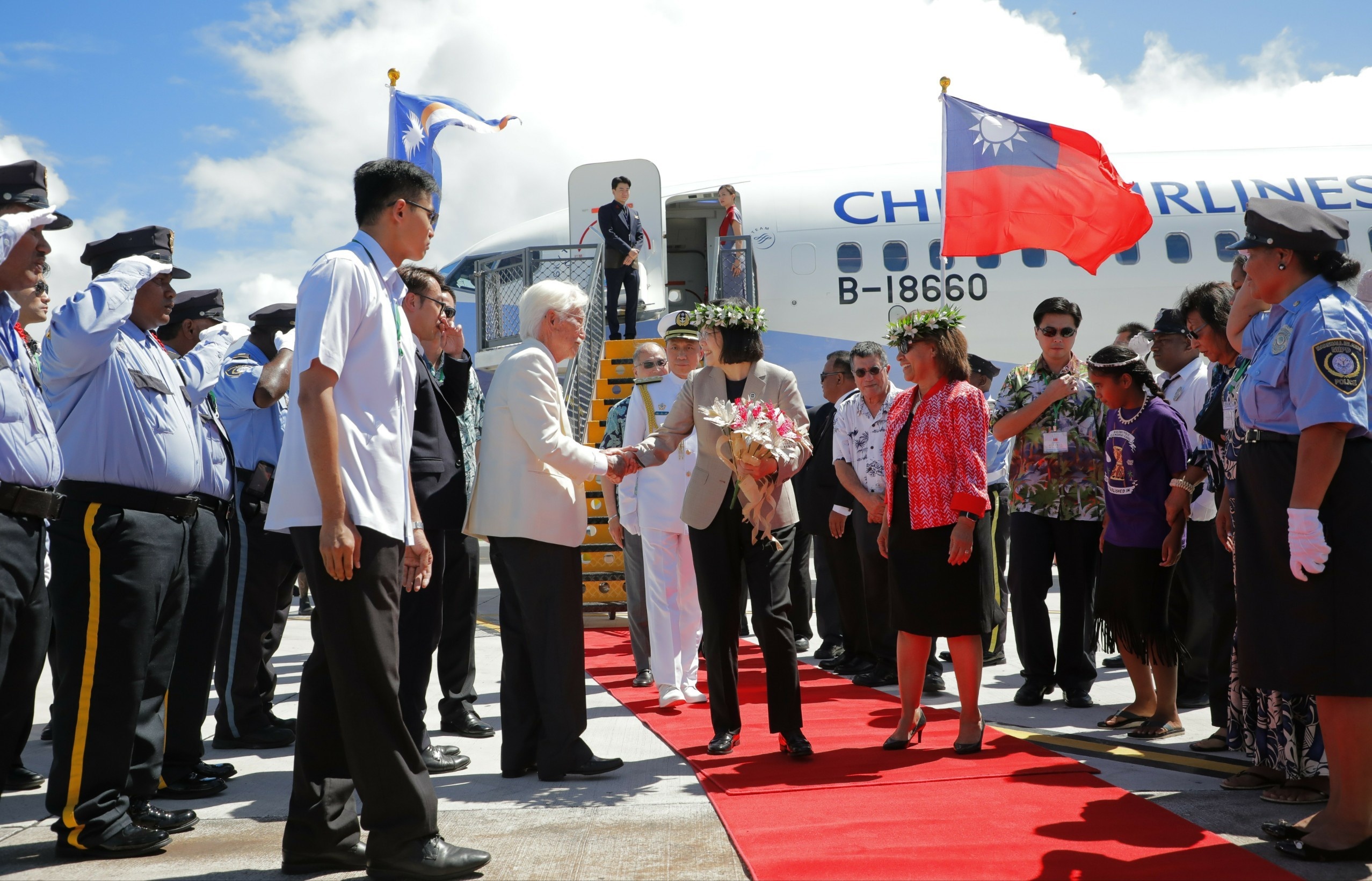
Marshall Islands President Hilda Heine with Taiwan President Tsai Ing-wen in October 2017

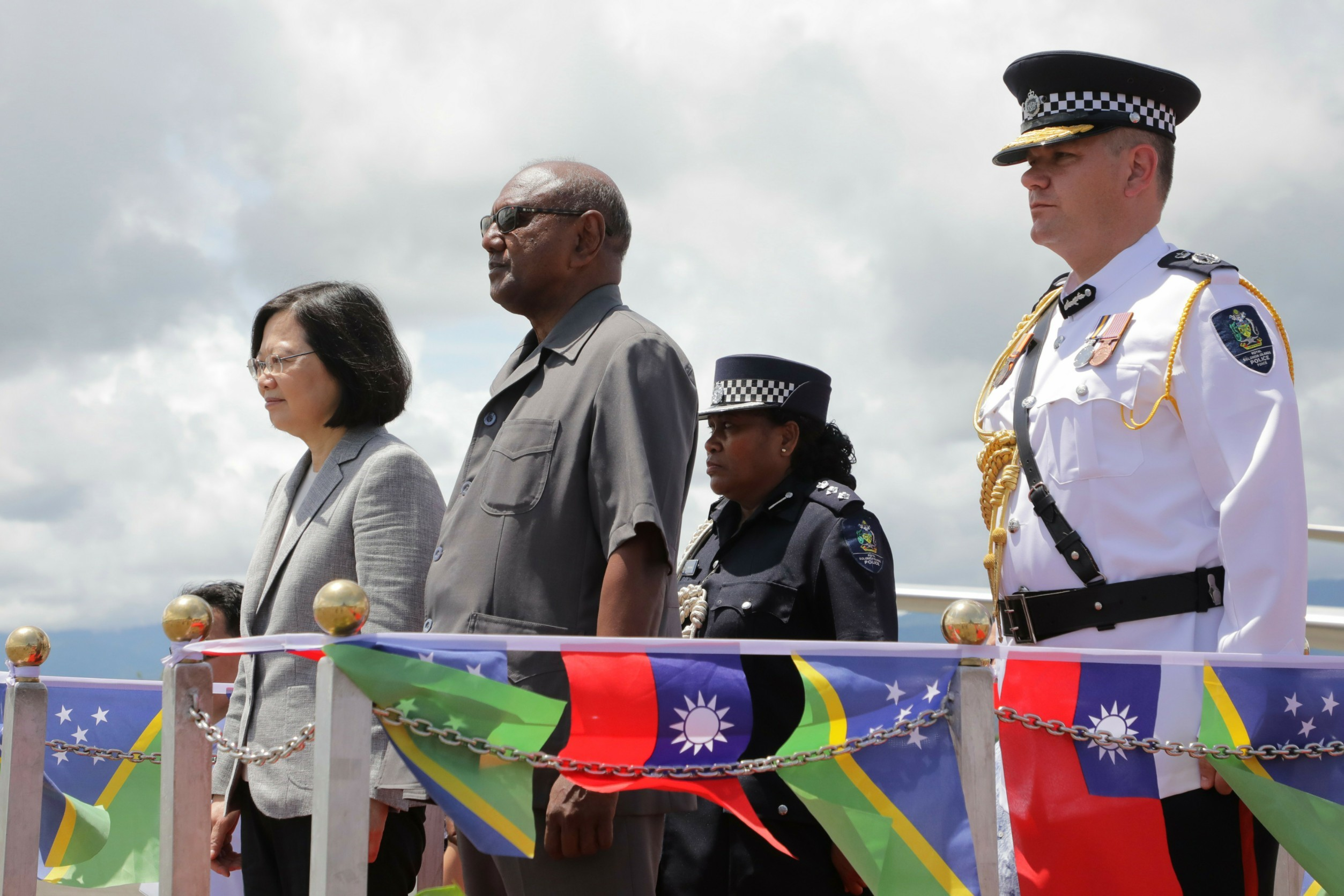
President Tsai Ing-wen's state visit to the Solomon Islands in November 2017

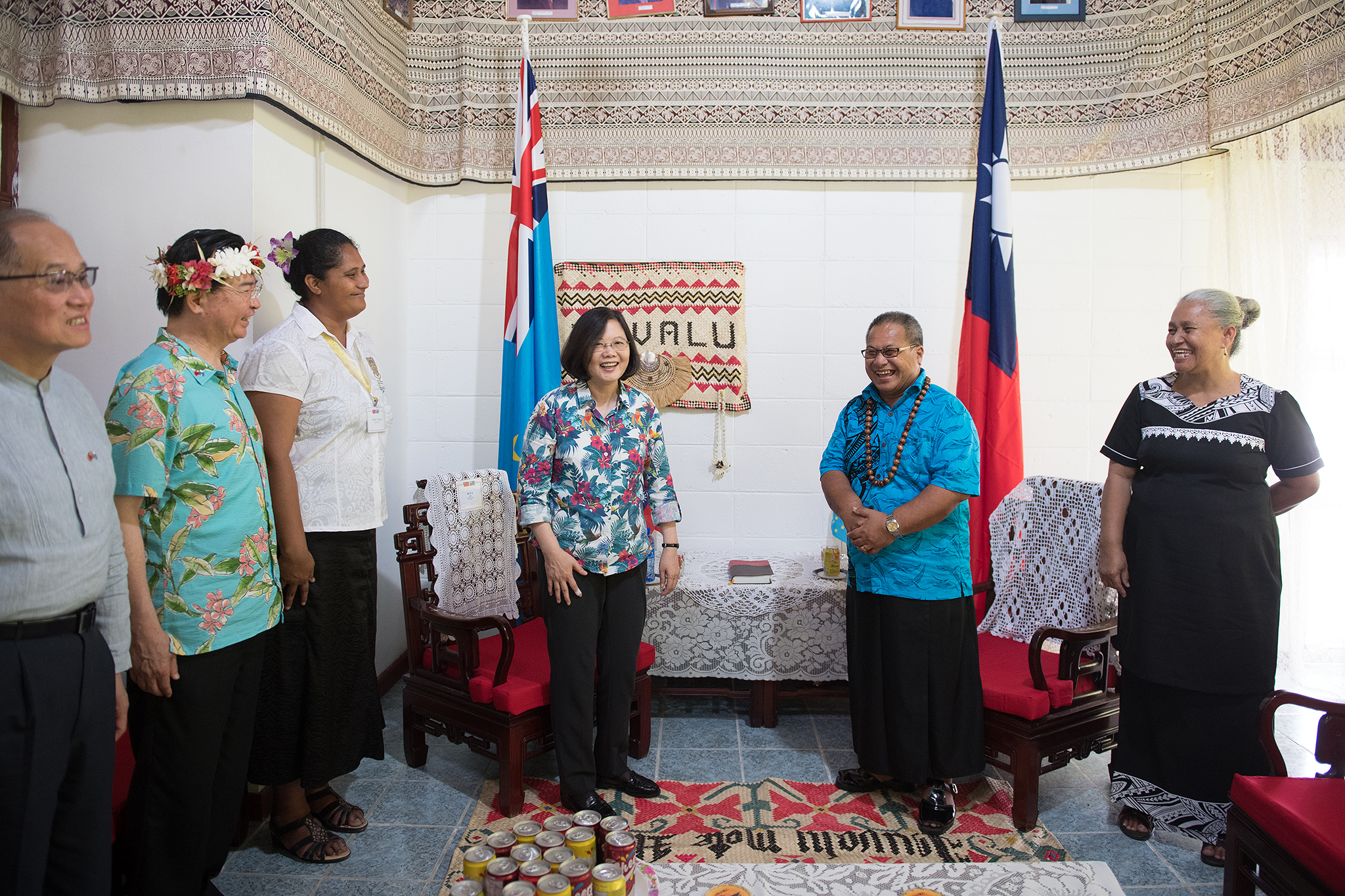
President Tsai visits Governor-General of Tuvalu Iakoba Italeli in November 2017

	Dates	Country	Locations	Details
2	7–8 January	United States	Houston	Transit.
2	8–9 January	Honduras	Tegucigalpa	State visit.
2	9–11 January	Nicaragua	Managua	Attended the presidential inauguration of Daniel Ortega.
2	11–12 January	Guatemala	Guatemala City	State visit.
2	12–13 January	El Salvador	San Salvador	State visit.
2	13–14 January	United States	San Francisco	Transit.
3	28–29 October	United States	Honolulu, Hawaii	Transit.
3	30–31 October	Marshall Islands	Majuro	State visit. Addressed the Marshall Islands parliament on 31 October.
3	1 November	Tuvalu	Funafuti	State visit.
3	1–3 November	Solomon Islands	Honiara	State visit. Addressed the national parliament and met with the country's leadership.
3	3–4 November	United States	Guam	Transit.

== 2018 ==
	Dates	Country	Locations	Details
4	17–20 April	Eswatini	Mbabane	State visit.
5	14–16 August	Paraguay	Asunción	State visit.
5	16–18 August	Belize	Belmopan	State visit.

== 2019 ==
	Dates	Country	Locations	Details
6	21–24 March	Palau	Ngerulmud	State visit, the first stop of the "Oceans of Democracy" tour.
6	24–25 March	Nauru	Yaren	State visit.
6	25–27 March	Marshall Islands	Majuro	State visit.
7	11–13 July	United States	New York City	Transit on the outbound leg of the "Journey of Freedom, Democracy, and Sustainability" tour.
7	13 July	Haiti	Port-au-Prince	State visit.
7	13–16 July	Saint Kitts and Nevis	Basseterre	State visit.
7	16–17 July	Saint Vincent and the Grenadines	Kingstown	State visit.
7	17–19 July	Saint Lucia	Castries	State visit.
7	21–22 July	United States	Denver	Transit on the return leg.

== 2023 ==
	Dates	Country	Locations	Details
8	29–31 March	United States	New York City	Delivered remarks at a banquet with Taiwanese expatriates and accepted the Hudson Institute's Global Leadership Award. Met with Hakeem Jeffries, the Minority Leader of the US House of Representatives, and a bipartisan group of US Senators: Joni Ernst, Mark Kelly, and Dan Sullivan.
8	31 March–2 April	Guatemala	Guatemala City, Chimaltenango, Flores	Attended a state banquet hosted by Guatemalan President Alejandro Giammattei, attended the signing of a Taiwan–Guatemala basic cooperation agreement, inaugurated a hospital built through a joint project, met with Taiwanese expatriates, and visited Tikal National Park.
8	2–4 April	Belize	Belmopan	Delivered an address to the National Assembly of Belize, attended a state banquet hosted by Governor-General Froyla Tzalam, attended a banquet hosted by Prime Minister Johnny Briceño, attended the signing of a Taiwan–Belize technical cooperation framework agreement, and visited a sheep and goat breeding project and a women's empowerment project.
8	4–5 April	United States	Simi Valley	Stopped at the Ronald Reagan Presidential Library to meet with Kevin McCarthy, the Speaker of the US House of Representatives, and a bipartisan delegation of House members. It was the first time a President of Taiwan had met a US House Speaker on American soil.

== See also ==
- List of international presidential trips made by Lai Ching-te, her successor
