= Aurora Cáceres =

Peruvian-Uruguayan writer

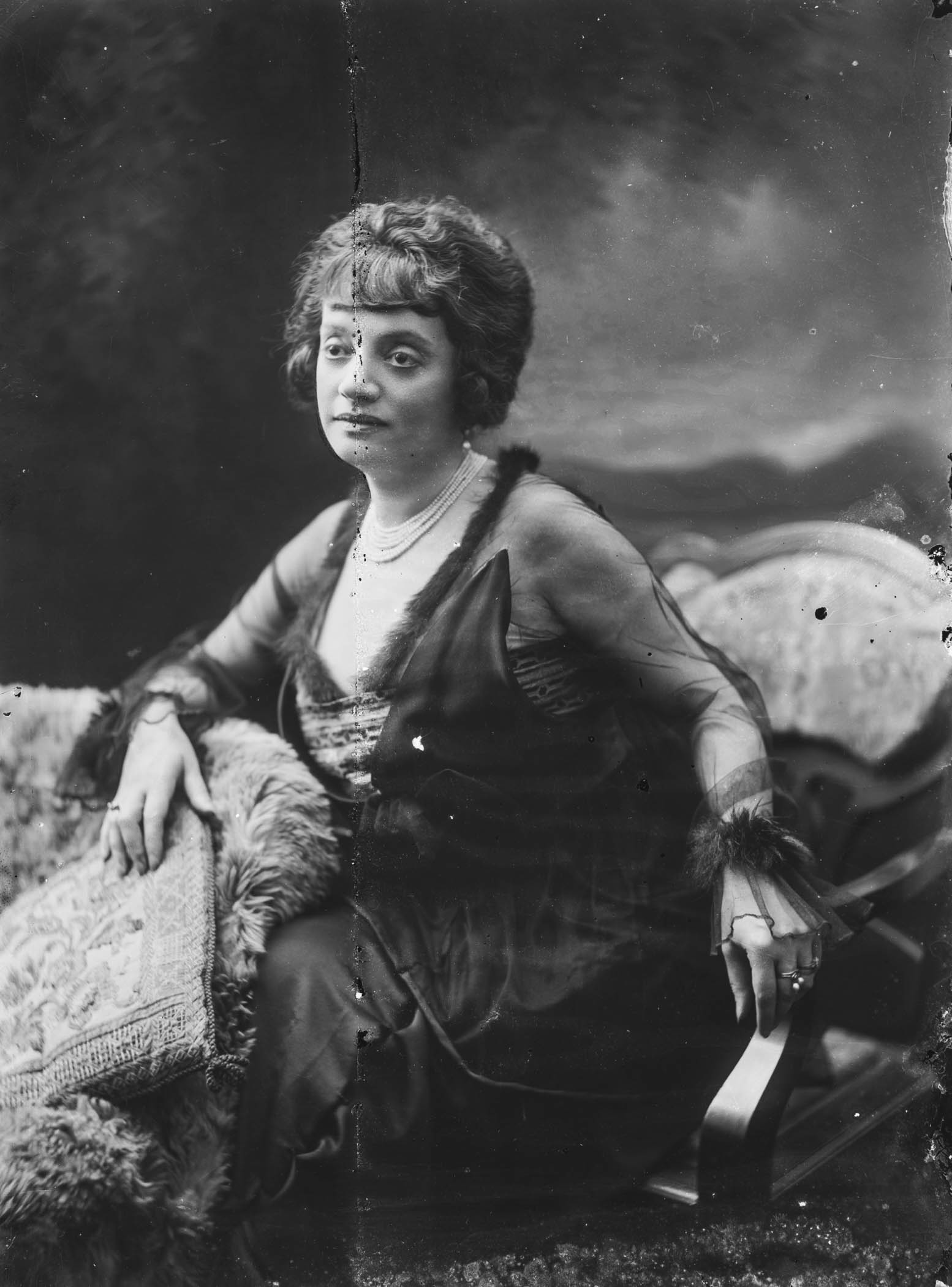
- Cáceres in 1925
- Born: Zoila Aurora Cáceres Moreno; 1877
- Died: 1958 (aged 80–81)
- Other name: Evangelina
- Citizenship: Peruvian, Uruguayan
- Occupations: Journalist and writer
- Political party: Constitutional Party
- Spouse(s): Enrique Gómez Carrillo (1905-1906)
- Parent(s): Andrés Avelino Cáceres; Antonia Moreno Leyva
- Writing career
- Language: Modern Spanish
- Genres: Novel; Essay

Zoila Aurora Cáceres Moreno (1877–1958) was a Peruvian and Uruguayan writer associated with the literary movement known as modernismo. Based in Europe, she wrote novels, essays, travel literature and a biography of her husband, the Guatemalan novelist Enrique Gómez Carrillo.

== Biography ==
Cáceres was born in 1877, the daughter of Peruvian president Andrés Avelino Cáceres and first lady Antonia Moreno Leyva. Her life was intimately intertwined with Peruvian history, the War of the Pacific (1879–1883), the Peruvian Civil War of 1895, and an intellectual's exile in Paris. During the War of the Pacific, her sister was killed while her family was fleeing from the Chileans. Her father Andrés Avelino Cáceres, at that time a colonel in the Peruvian Army, was mounting a guerrilla war against the occupying army. Peru (and Bolivia) lost that war and the Chileans occupied Lima, the country's capital. After the Chileans departed, now General Cáceres served in a variety of functions, as a diplomat in Europe, president of the Republic, and then exiled after a bloody coup in 1895. All of these events affected Cáceres, who was educated by nuns in Germany and at the Sorbone in Paris. She was known to many of the major modernista authors including Amado Nervo, Rubén Darío and Enrique Gómez Carrillo, whom she married.

== Writing ==
Cáceres left behind political tracts and a wide gamut of writing. According to César Lévano, she founded Feminine Evolution in 1911, in 1919 she organized a feminine strike for food, while in 1924 she organized a new organization, "Peruvian Feminism". She was a die-hard suffragist associated with Angela Ramos. Later she would work with the anti-fascist organization "Feminine Action". Her essays have recently begun to receive critical attention by scholars attempting to understand modernism from a gendered perspective.

Her novel La rosa muerta, for the first time in almost a century, was set in Paris where it was published in 1914. In a work sharing formal characteristics with modernista prose, Cáceres challenged the ideological parameters of the movement. While her protagonist appropriated the modernista precept of a woman as an object of male veneration, she also took active control of her sexual life in a world where husbands still treated their wives as objects. The objects in this novel are not people but implements of communication and medicine reflective of the apogee of the industrial age. The action, which takes place between Berlin and Paris, is representative of the places that the modernistas held dear, but the feminization of the portrayal of male-female relations broadens the scope of the male-dominated modernista literary paradigm. The ideal men in this novel are not the husbands from whom women run, but medical doctors, men of science who are liberated from chauvinist attitudes. The central character of “La rosa muerta” accordingly falls for one of her gynecologists, allowing for scenes in the Paris clinic that must have been scandalous for the 1914 reading public.

== Works ==
- Angelina, Eva. “La emancipación de la mujer”. El Búcaro Americano 1.6/1.7 (15 de mayo; 1 de junio de 1896): 117-118, 127–30.
- Cáceres, Zoila Aurora. Mujeres de ayer y de hoy. París: Garnier Hermanos, 1910.
- Cáceres, Zoila Aurora. Oasis de arte. Prólogo de Rubén Darío. París: Garnier Hermanos, c. 1910-1911.
- Cáceres, Aurora. La rosa muerta /Las perlas de Rosa. Prólogo de Amado Nervo. Paris: Garnier Hermanos, 1914.
- Cáceres, Zoila Aurora & Andrés Avelino Cáceres. La campaña de la Breña, memorias del mariscal del Perú, D. Andrés A. Cáceres. Lima, Imp. Americana, 1921.
- Cáceres, Z. Aurora (Evangelina). La ciudad del sol. Prólogo de Enrique Gómez Carrillo. Lima: Librería Francesa Científica/Casa Editorial F. Rosay, 1927.
- Cáceres, [Zoila] Aurora (Evangelina). Mi vida con Enrique Gómez Carrillo. Madrid: Renacimiento, 1929.
- Cáceres, Zoila Aurora. La princesa Suma Tica (narraciones peruanas). Madrid: Editorial Mundo Latino, 1929.
- Cáceres, Zoila Aurora. Labor de armonía interamericana en los Estados Unidos de Norte América, 1940–1945. Washington, 1946.
- Cáceres, Zoila Aurora. Epistolario relativo a Miguel de Unamuno. En Unamuno y el Perú. Ed. Wilfredo Kapsoli. Lima/Salamanca: Universidad Ricardo Palma/ Universidad de Salamanca, 2002: 27–31.
- Cáceres, Aurora. A Dead Rose. Trans. Laura Kanost. Stockcero, 2018.

== Works on Cáceres and her time ==
- Arriola Grande, Maurilio. Diccionario literario del Perú: Nomenclatura por autores. Dos tomes. Lima: Editora Universo, 1983.
- Frederick, Bonnie. “Harriet Beecher Stowe and the Virtuous Mother: Argentina, 1852–1910”. Journal of Women's History 18.1 (2006): 101-120.
- Glickman, Robert Jay. Vestales del Templo azul: notas sobre el feminismo hispanoamericano en la época modernista. Toronto: Canadian Academy of the Arts, 1996.
- Herrera, Eduardo. “Una visita a Evangelina”. En La ciudad del sol de Aurora Cáceres. Lima: Librería Francesa Científica/Casa Editorial E. Rosay, 1927: 185–193.
- Kanost, Laura. "Translator's Introduction". A Dead Rose by Aurora Cáceres. Trans. Laura Kanost. Stockcero, 2018: vii-xxv.
- Levano, César. "Las mujeres y el poder" Caretas (1999).
- Minardi, Giovanna. “La narrativa femenina en el Perú del siglo XX”. Alba de América 37/38 (2001): 177–196.
- Rojas–Trempe, Lady. “Escritoras peruanas al alba del próximo milenio”. En Perú en su cultura. Eds. Daniel Castillo Durante y Borka Sattler. Lima/Ottawa: PromPerú/University of Ottawa; 2002: 175–181.
- Rojas-Trempe, Lady. "Mujeres y movimientos sociales en América Latina: Angela Ramos y Magda Portal, escritoras políticas de pie en la historia del Perú". Debate: Literatura y género (2004).
- Ward, Thomas. "Los caminos posibles de Nietzsche en el modernismo", Nueva Revista de Filología Hispánica 50.2 (julio-diciembre de 2002): 480-515.
- Ward, Thomas. "Introducción". La Rosa Muerta. Buenos Aires: Stockcero, 2007: vii-xxiv. ISBN 987-1136-61-7
