= Boleros con Orquesta =

Studio album by Rodrigo de la Cadena
- Released: January 2007
- Recorded: 2006
- Genre: Bolero, big band
- Length: 55:36
- Label: Independent
- Producer: Rodrigo de la Cadena

Rodrigo de la Cadena chronology
Nuevamente... El Bolero (2005)	Boleros con Orquesta (2007)	De La Cadena III (2008)

Boleros Con Orquesta is the second solo album by artist Rodrigo de la Cadena. It was originally intended to be released in late 2006, but because of the difficulty of schedule of his international tour it was delayed until January 2007. The bonus and final two tracks of the album were recorded only by his piano and voice in a rare studio session that took place in 2005.

Boleros Con Orquesta marks the first attempt and experiment of Bolero Big Band music by Rodrigo de la Cadena. Every musician that contributed on this album was personally chosen by Rodrigo de la Cadena himself; building his own orchestra from scratch for his new album. It includes famous international piano player Tito Enriquez.

This album also contains two poems, narrated by Rodrigo de la Cadena. It also features the first time he uses a medley of Bolero music in a studio album.

== Track listing ==
1. "Pasatiempo de Amor" (Enrique Daguer) - 3:58
2. "Una Semana Sin Ti" (Vicente Garrido) - 3:32
3. "Despierta Paloma" (Enrique Navarro) - 3:52
4. "Comprendeme" (Maria Alma) - 3:34
5. "No Puedo Ser Feliz" (Adolfo Guzmán) - 3:05
6. "Mirame" (Agustín Lara) - 3:34
7. "Poema: Quiero Ser Un Tu Vida" (Martin Galas) - 1:15
8. "Quisiera Ser" (Mario Clavell) - 3:16
9. "Popurri: I. Dejame, II. Calla, III. Llevame" (Gonzalo Curiel con Ricardo López Mendez/Curiel/Curiel) - 5:45
10. "Poema: Por Cobardia" (Amado Nervo) - 0:58
11. "Te Vi Pasar" (Agustín Lara) - 3:31
12. "Vete De Mi" (Homero y Virgilio Exposito) - 2:33
13. "Ven Aca" (Agustín Lara) - 3:35
14. "Silencio" (Rafael Hernández) - 3:32

=== Bonus tracks ===
1. "Llegaste Tarde" (Wello Rivas) - 4:02
2. "Hasta Que Vuelvas" (Felipe Gil y Mario Arturo Ramos) - 4:40

== Personnel ==
- Rodrigo de la Cadena – piano, guitar, vocals
- Tito Enriquez – piano

== Trivia ==
Rodrigo de la Cadena introduced this album before a live audience at the Auditorio Nacional's Lunario.
