= Nuevamente... El Bolero =

Studio album by Rodrigo de la Cadena
- Released: April 2005
- Recorded: 2005 at Orfeon
- Genre: Bolero
- Label: Orfeón
- Producer: Edgardo Obregon Mazon

Rodrigo de la Cadena chronology
Nuevamente... El Bolero (2005)	Boleros con Orquesta (2007)

Nuevamente... El Bolero is the first solo album by artist Rodrigo de la Cadena. It was first released in 2005. Out of the 12 songs released on this album, there were over 30 demos of different compositions by Agustín Lara, Luis Demetrio, Armando Manzanero, etc. Sessions took place at Discos Orfeon.

== Track listing ==
1. "Poquita Fe" (Bobby Capo)
2. "Llevatela" (Armando Manzanero)
3. "Enamorada" (Agustín Lara)
4. "La Enramada" (Graciela Olmos)
5. "Cenizas" (Wello Rivas)
6. "Pequena" (Homero Exposito y Osmar Maderna)
7. "Somos Diferentes" (Pablo Beltrán Ruiz)
8. "Te Me Olvidas" (Vicente Garrido)
9. "No Te Vayas, No" (Álvaro Carrillo)
10. "Campanitas de Cristal" (Rafael Hernández)
11. "Mienteme" (Armando Dominguez)
12. "A Donde Quiera" (Rafael de Jesus Mondova)

== Musicians ==
- Rodrigo de la Cadena (piano), (guitar), (vocals)
- Armando Castro (drums), (percussions)
- Arturo Neri (string arrangements)
- Victor "Vitillo" Ruiz Pasos (bass guitar)

== Trivia ==
"Rodrigo de la Cadena" was only 17 years old when he recorded his debut album.
