= Ania Szado =

Canadian writer

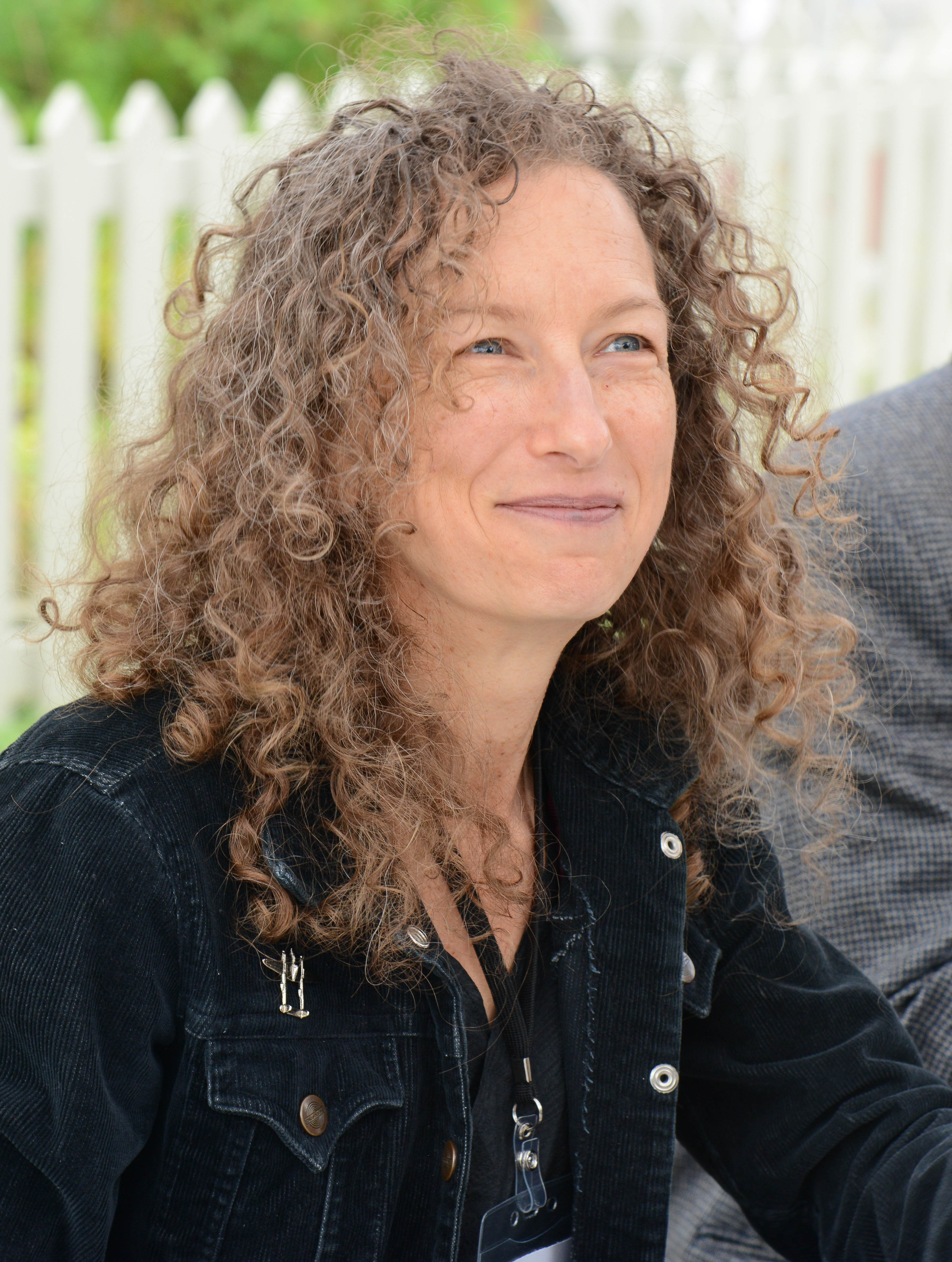
- Szado at the Eden Mills Writers' Festival in 2013

Ania Szado is a Canadian writer.

Ania Szado is a graduate of Ontario College of Art (now called OCAD University) and has an MFA in creative writing from the University of British Columbia. She attended Humber School for Writers, studying under authors Nino Ricci and Anne Michaels.

Szado's forthcoming historical novel, Studio Saint-Ex imagines the famous flyer and writer Antoine de Saint-Exupéry during his days in New York in World War II as he is writing his masterpiece The Little Prince. The story is told through the remembrances of two women, his wife Consuelo de Saint-Exupéry and the fictional young fashion designer Mignonne Lachapelle, who comes from Montreal to make her name in the early days of American haute couture. The book will be published in April 2013 by Alfred A. Knopf and Penguin Canada and will soon be available in translation in Italy, Poland and Russia.

Szado's debut novel, Beginning of Was, was published by Penguin Canada in 2004. It was shortlisted for the Commonwealth Writers' Prize (Canada and Caribbean region), named one of NOW Magazine's Top Ten Books of 2004 and nominated for the international Kiriyama Prize. Her short story Camping at Wal-Mart appeared in the anthology All Sleek and Skimming (Orca Books, 2006, ed. Lisa Heggum), which was named to the New York Public Library's "Books for the Teen Age 2007" list. Szado's short fiction and non-fiction have appeared This Magazine, Flare Magazine, The Globe and Mail, Taddle Creek, and Lichen Literary Journal, among other publications. Her short story, "Patricia's Legs," was nominated for the National Magazine Awards and the Journey Prize.

Szado has taught creative writing at Humber College.
