= Consuelo de Saint-Exupéry =

Salvadoran and French writer and artist (1901–1979)

Madame Consuelo de Saint-Exupéry
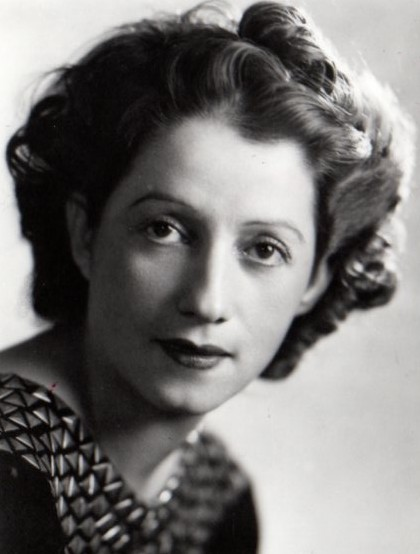
- Consuelo de Saint-Exupéry in 1942
- Born: Consuelo Suncín de Sandoval; 10 April 1901; Armenia, El Salvador
- Died: 28 May 1979 (aged 78); Grasse, France
- Resting place: Père Lachaise Cemetery
- Citizenship: El Salvador; France
- Occupations: Writer; artist
- Spouses: Ricardo Cárdenas (divorced) Enrique Gómez Carrillo (m. 1926; died 1927) Antoine de Saint-Exupéry (m. 1931; died 1944)

Consuelo, Viscountess de Saint-Exupéry (née Suncín de Sandoval; 10 April 1901 – 28 May 1979) was a Salvadoran and French writer and artist, and was married to the French aristocrat, writer and pioneering aviator Antoine de Saint-Exupéry.

== Early life ==
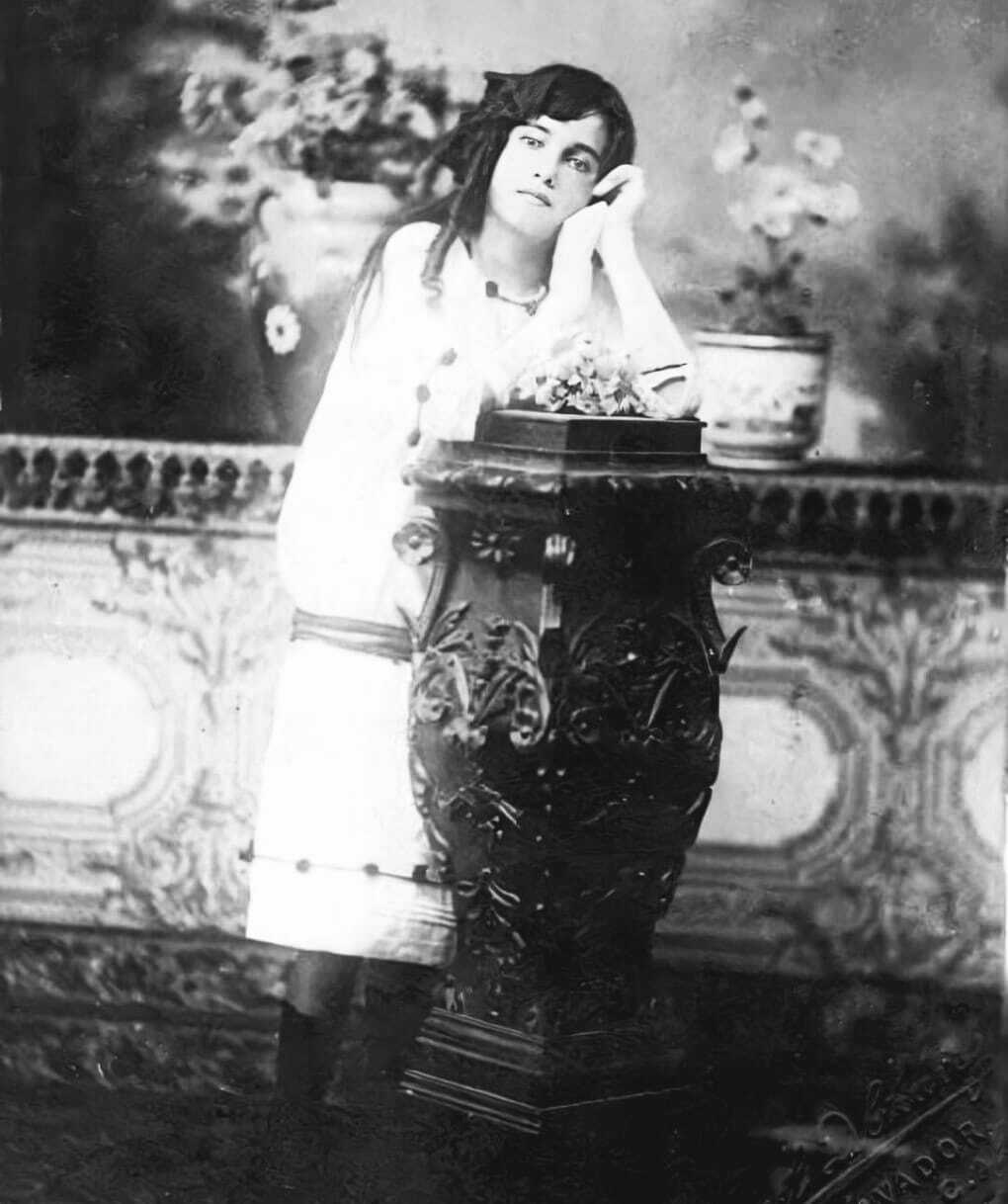
The young Consuelo Suncin Sandoval Zeceña de Saint-Exupéry

Born Consuelo Suncín de Sandoval as the daughter of a rich coffee grower and army reservist, she grew up in a family of wealthy landowners in a small town in the Salvadoran department of Sonsonate. Due to her asthma, her father sent her abroad to the United States, where she studied in San Francisco; later she studied in Mexico City, and France.

== Personal life ==
Her first marriage was to a Mexican army captain, Ricardo Cárdenas, whom she met in the United States. Though this marriage ended in divorce, she lied and said it ended with his death during the Mexican Revolution, since divorced women were then stigmatized by society, and being a widow was preferable to being a divorced woman. While in France, she met and later married Enrique Gómez Carrillo, a Guatemalan writer, diplomat and journalist. Following his death in 1927, she took up residence in Buenos Aires.

In 1931 in Buenos Aires, she met and married the French aristocrat, writer and pioneering aviator Count Antoine de Saint-Exupéry, making her a countess. At the time Consuelo was a once-divorced, once-widowed Salvadoran writer and artist who possessed a bohemian spirit and was known as a mischief-maker. Saint-Exupéry, thoroughly enchanted by the diminutive woman, would leave and then return to her many times; she was both his muse and over the long term the source of much of his angst. It was a stormy union, with Saint-Exupéry travelling frequently and indulging in numerous extramarital affairs, most notably with the Frenchwoman Hélène de Vogüé (1908–2003), known as 'Nelly' and referred to as "Madame de B." in Saint-Exupéry biographies.

== Career ==
Consuelo also had numerous extramarital affairs. Following the disappearance of her husband in July 1944, with her loss of Saint-Exupéry still fresh, she purportedly wrote a memoir of their life together, The Tale of the Rose, which was sealed away in a trunk in her home. Two decades after her death in 1979, the manuscript came to light when José Martinez-Fructuoso, her heir and long-time employee, and his wife, Martine, discovered it in an attic trunk. Alain Vircondelet, author of a biography of Antoine de Saint-Exupéry, edited it, improving her French and dividing it into chapters. Its publication in France in 2000, one century after Antoine de Saint-Exupéry's birth on 29 June 1900, became a national sensation. As of 2011, it has been translated into sixteen languages.

== Death ==
Consuelo died on 28 May 1979 and is buried in Père Lachaise Cemetery in Paris, alongside her second husband Enrique Gómez Carrillo.

== Portrayal in The Little Prince ==
Despite their tumultuous relationship, Antoine kept Consuelo close to his heart. Consuelo, who had asthma, is the likely inspiration for the major character in The Little Prince, the prince's petulant, vain, but fragile 'flower', identified as The Rose, whom he protects under glass and with a windscreen on his tiny planet which is named Asteroid B-612.

Saint-Exupéry's infidelity and doubts about his marriage are symbolised by the field of roses the Prince encounters during his visit to Earth. In the novella, The Fox tells The Prince that his Rose is unique and special, because she is the one whom he loves.

The Prince's home asteroid also possesses three tiny volcanoes, likely inspired by the three volcanoes in the Cordillera de Apaneca volcanic range complex, which are directly visible from Consuelo's home town of Armenia, El Salvador. Consuelo's home country is also known as the "Land of Volcanoes". The two active volcanoes were inspired by the Santa Ana Volcano and the famous conical-shaped Izalco, which was likely spewing ash and lava when Antoine visited El Salvador. The dormant volcano is Cerro Verde.

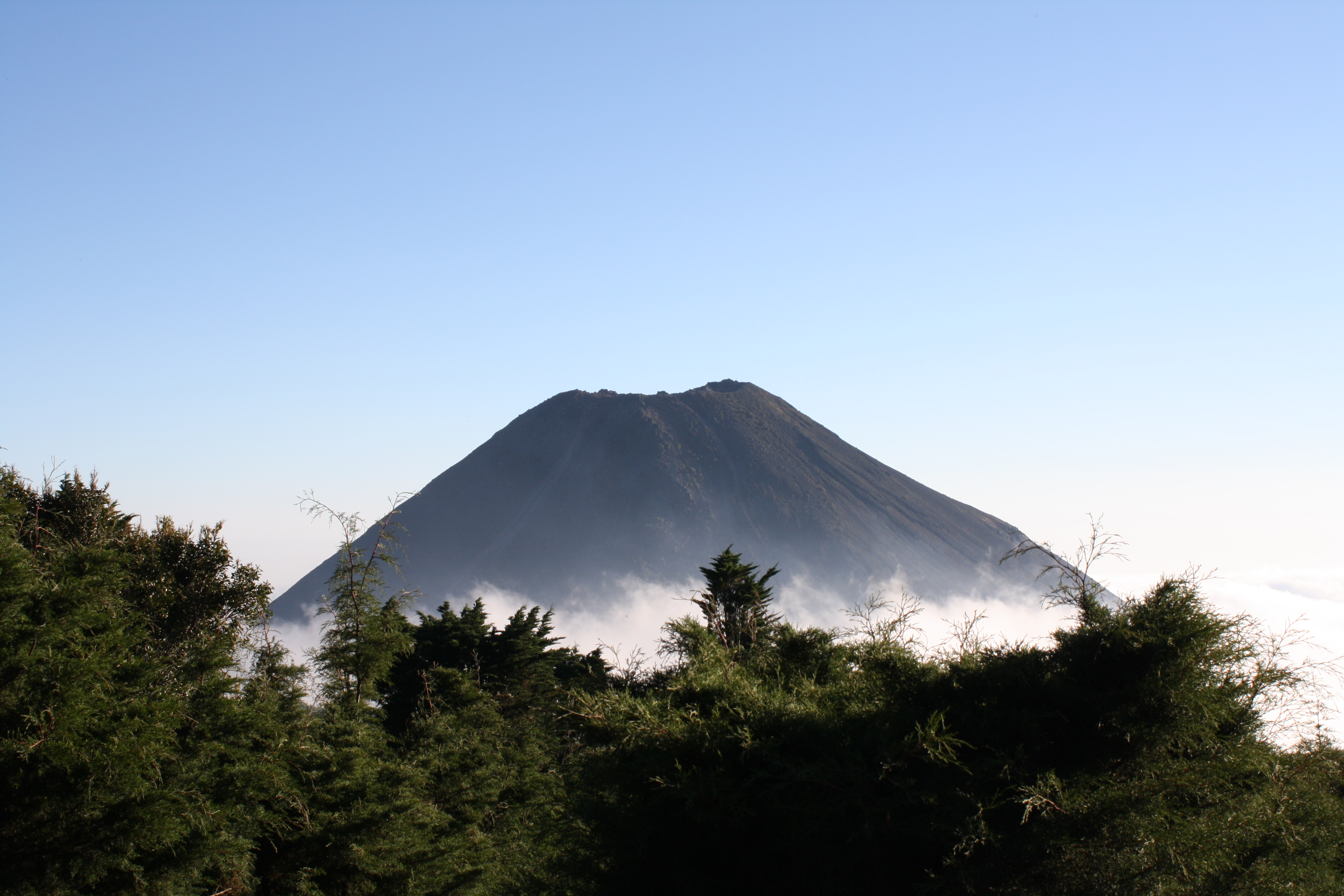
One of the active volcanoes in The Little Prince was inspired by El Salvador's Izalco (volcano). At the time Antoine visited Consuelo's home town, Izalco was active spewing ash and lava.

== Honours ==
Antoine's 1939 memoir, Wind, Sand and Stars (Terre des hommes), was employed to create the central theme—Terre des hommes/Man and his world—of the 1967 International World's Fair in Montreal, Canada, Expo 67. The Countess de Saint Exupéry, Consuelo, was a guest of honour at the official opening ceremonies of the world's fair.

== Popular culture ==
Actress Janet Waldo was the voice for The Rose in the animated TV series "The Adventures of the Little Prince". Singer Máiréad Carlin played The Rose in The Little Prince musical. Consuelo's relationship with Antoine was portrayed by Miranda Richardson and Bruno Ganz in the 1996 biopic Saint-Ex. The film combines elements of biography, documentary, and dramatic re-creation. Consuelo is also a major character in the forthcoming historical novel Studio Saint-Ex by Ania Szado. The book examines Consuelo and Antoine's time in New York City during World War II while Antoine is writing The Little Prince.
