= List of international presidential trips made by Lai Ching-te =

This is a list of international presidential trips made by Lai Ching-te, the 8th and current president of Taiwan.

== Summary ==
The number of visits per country where he has travelled are:

- One visit to: Palau, Marshall Islands, Tuvalu, Eswatini.
- Two visits to: the United States.

== 2024 ==
	Dates	Country	Locations	Details
1	30 November–3 December	United States	Hawaii	Transit.
1	3 December–4 December	Marshall Islands	Majuro	State visit.
1	4 December	Tuvalu	Funafuti	State visit.
1	4–5 December	United States	Guam	Transit.
1	5–6 December	Palau	Ngerulmud	State visit.

== 2026 ==
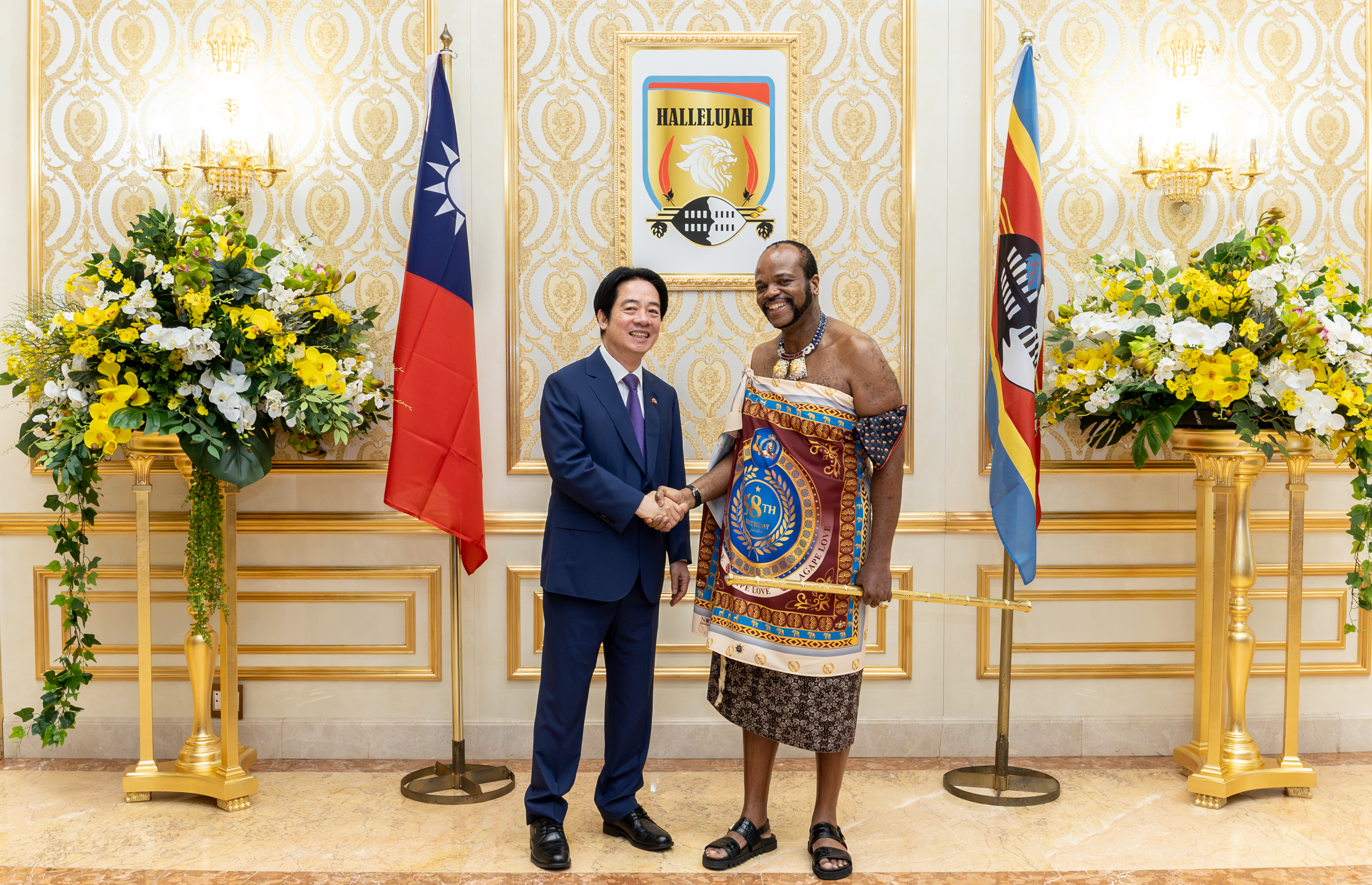
President Lai Ching-te and King Mswati III in May 2026

	Dates	Country	Locations	Details
2	2–5 May	Eswatini	Mbabane	State visit.

== See also ==
- List of international presidential trips made by Tsai Ing-wen, his predecessor
