= María Jesús Alvarado Rivera =

Peruvian feminist, activist and educator (1878–1971)

- Born: María Jesús Alvarado Rivera; 27 May 1878; Chincha Alta, Peru
- Died: 6 May 1971; San Isidro, Lima, Peru
- Parent(s): Cayetano Alvarado Arciniega and Jesus Rivera Martinez

María Jesús Alvarado Rivera (27 May 1878 – 6 May 1971) was a Peruvian rebel feminist, educator, journalist, writer and social activist. She was noted by the National Council of Women of Peru in 1969 as the "first modern champion of women's rights in Peru".

== Early life ==
Alvarado Rivera was born in Chincha Alta on 27 May 1878. Her parents were Cayetano Alvarado Arciniega, owner and administrator of the estate Chacrabajo, and Jesus Rivera Martinez; they were both natives of Chincha Province. She was the tenth of thirteen children. Due to the War of the Pacific, her family was forced to sell their property and settle in Lima. As was customary for that time her education went only until the primary school. However, during that short time, she learned to read and write well. Her subsequent studies were self-taught. She then attended a private high school run by Elvira García y García (leader of the feminist movement in Peru), after which she became a teacher. Disturbed by the antiquated educational system, she studied sociology on her own and was instrumental in introducing advanced methods of "vocational education, euthanasia, the health and the matrimonial care of school children and the control of sexually transmitted diseases." She also believed in women's role as a mother.

== Career ==
With the help of her brother, Lorenzo Antonino, who was Professor of Geology at the National University of San Marcos, she got a job as a columnist for the newspaper El Comercio. She also found work at El Diario (1908), and years later, for La Prensa. She made her first presentation on feminist issues at the International Women's Congress in 1910. The following year, she lectured on feminism at the Geographical Society of Lima, explaining the basics of feminism as part of a current global social change that raised the need to provide equal civil and political rights to women." It was at this conference that Alvarado Rivera sparked public interest in the idea of women's suffrage, though with mixed responses. The Daughters of Palma, Angelica, and Augusta claimed "Finally the woman has appeared who will liberate us from the oppressive subordination in which we live," after hearing her lecture. Others thought her ideas were too radical and would cause anarchy and deterioration of family values as women abandoned their traditional roles.

Alvarado Rivera played a crucial role in establishing, in 1914, the Evolución Femenina in Lima. She also mooted proposals to enact civil codes and to induct women in government jobs. Her sustained campaign for nine years in this direction resulted in the Chamber of Representatives allowing women to become members of the public welfare societies (1915), which eventually was enacted as law (1922). Evolución Femenina also drew criticism from the community. Only a small number of women agreed to put their names on membership rolls, and La Cronica of Lima printed a photo in late 1924 of a talk given by Alvarado Rivera in which many attendees had removed their hats to cover their faces from the photographer.

In 1923, after a visit to Peru by Carrie Chapman Catt, the president of the International Suffrage Alliance, Alvarado Rivera established the National Council for Women. This organization was beset with serious problems arising between the radicals and the Catholics. Unfortunately, the National Council for Women began to experience conflicts early on, there was a divide concerning whether they should advocate for more than just women's suffrage. When she proposed that the council consider reforming civil code to grant women, particularly married women, equal rights before the law, there was strong resistance and skepticism from newspapers and affiliates of the council. Despite this, as part of the movement on women's rights, she established a "Labor and Moral School Workshop" to educate prostitutes and return them to the mainstream of society.

Because of her strong support towards empowering women with voting rights and full equality at Pan-American Women's Conference held in Lima, she was jailed and subsequently exiled. The opposition was spearheaded by the Catholic Women's League, which was seconded by the then President of Peru, Augusto B. Leguía. She spent three months in Santo Tomas Women's Prison during Christmas-time 1924 and then spent 12 years in exile in Argentina. In Argentina, she taught school and directed dramas which she had authored on subjects of social and moral issues in society.

After returning from exile, she devoted her time to radio, theater, and cinema, with the primary purpose of getting voting rights for women in Peru. She also wrote a play, The Perricholi, that was aired by Radio Nacional del Perú. She established the Academy of Dramatic Arts, "Ollanta", with her own money which found acceptance by the Ministry of Education as it helped to create the Directorate of Cultural and Art in Peru. In 1938, she mooted the introduction of the "Code of Rights" for women, in 1940, she wrote on the topic of "Eugenics and Child" in Semana de la Salud. In 1945, the government approved her proposal to establish the national theater. She also became the Councillor of the Municipality of Lima.

The feminist movement launched by Alvarado Rivera took a long time to take shape, and it was only in 1955 that women got the right to vote in Peru. She died on May 6, 1971, at 92 years of age, with her efforts in the feminist movement receiving little acclaim during her lifetime.

== Legacy ==
On 8 March 2021, the Peruvian Government declared the work of Alvarado Rivera a part of the national heritage.
