= Chimaltenango =

- Municipality and city
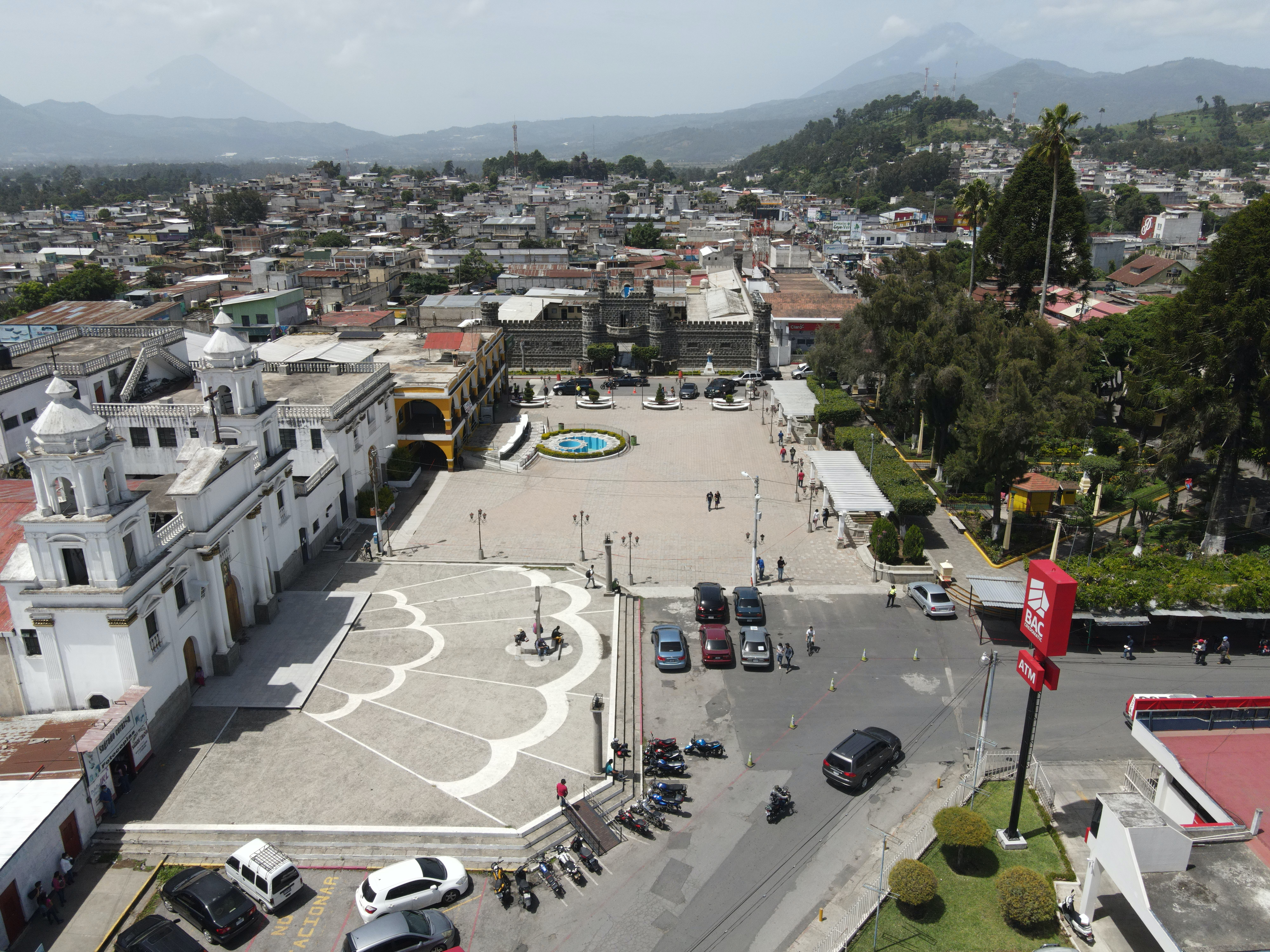
- Chimaltenango

- Location in Guatemala
- Coordinates: 14°39′44″N 90°49′15″W
- Country: Guatemala
- Department: Chimaltenango

Government
  - Mayor: Carlos Alexánder Simaj

Area
  - Municipality and city: 33 sq mi (86 km^{2})

Population (2018 census)
  - Municipality and city: 96,985
  - Density: 2,900/sq mi (1,100/km^{2})
  - Urban: 96,985
- Climate: Cwb

Chimaltenango is a city in Guatemala with a population of 96,985 (2018 census). It serves as both the capital of the department of Chimaltenango and the municipal seat for the surrounding municipality of the same name. Chimaltenango stands some 56 kilometres (35 mi) west of Guatemala City, on the Pan-American Highway. The municipal capital produces textiles and pottery.

== History ==
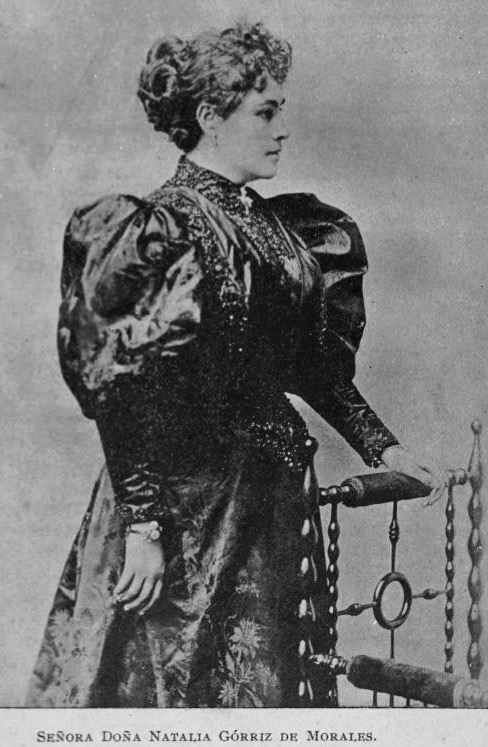
Teacher Natalia Górriz de Morales. Photograph from La Ilustración Guatemalteca.

In Pre-Columbian times, what is now the city of Chimaltenango was known to its native inhabitants as B'oko'. Like many other cities in the area, the Spanish Conquistadores used the name given by their Nahuatl speaking allies from central Mexico. The Nahuatl name was Chīmaltenānco, meaning "Shield City". The current town was founded in 1526 by Spanish conquistador Pedro de Portocarrero, and shortly after it was assigned by Bishop Francisco Marroquín to the Order of Preachers, along with Jocotenango, Jilotepeque, Sumpango, Candelaria, Amatitlán, Petapa, Mixco, and Pinula. These were the general areas under the jurisdiction of "Valle de Pasuya" (English: Pasuya Valley) in those days (which had nine valleys), among them the Chimaltenango Valley. This valley bordered with Xilotepeque valley on the northwest, with Mixco valley on the East, with Guatemala on the North, and with Sololá Prinvice on the West. Furthermore, the Valle of Pasuya had two mayor municipalities: Chimaltenango (which included the Chimaltenango, Xilotepeque, and Alotenango valleys), and Sacatepéquez (which included the remainder).

After independence from Spain in 1821, the town was elevated to "Villa" status in 1825 but apparently lost some luster, as one can infer from archeologist Alfred Percival Maudslay wife's description from a trip there in 1895. Anne Cary Maudslay, wrote: "We were not tempted to loiter for long, and rode on again over the dull plain to the uninteresting town of Chimaltenango, where we proposed to spend the night. The hotel was dirty and the bedrooms so unpleasant that we would have none of them, and sent Gorgonio to hunt for an empty room in which we could put up our own beds. This he found in a "meson", or caravanserai, attached to the hotel, where there was a good-sized room and a rough kitchen opening on a patio in which we could turn the beasts loose for the night. A sprinkling with water, a good sweeping, and a free use of Keating's powder, soon made the room habitable. The supper at the hotel was, however, far above the average, and the only thing to complain of was the poor forage supplied to the mules."

== Sports ==
América de Chimaltenango football club has played the 2009 - 2010 season in Guatemala's second division. They play their home games in the Estadio Municipal de Chimaltenango.

== Famous citizens ==
- Natalia Górriz de Morales, teacher. She was the director of "Instituto Normal Central para Señoritas" (English: Normal Central Institute for Girls) and Elementary School Inspector during General José María Reina Barrios' presidency and was married to the Minister of Economy, Colonel Próspero Morales. In 1897, he resigned his position and raised arms as one of the leaders of the Quetzaltenango Revolution against his former boss General Reina Barrios, after he tried to extend his presidential term to 1902 after the failure of the Central American Expo and the acute economic crisis that mired Guatemala. After the Reina Barrios murder in February 1898, Morales ran for office in the 1898 presidential elections. When he realized that those were rigged in favor of Interim President Manuel Estrada Cabrera, he tried to invade Guatemala from Mexico, but died in the attempt. Natalia Górriz de Morales then started teaching again and became one of the more representative women of the early 20th century in Guatemala.

== Climate ==
Chimaltenango has a subtropical highland climate (Köppen: Cwb).

Climate data for Chimaltenango
Month	Jan	Feb	Mar	Apr	May	Jun	Jul	Aug	Sep	Oct	Nov	Dec	Year
Mean daily maximum °C (°F)	22.0 (71.6)	22.9 (73.2)	24.7 (76.5)	25.1 (77.2)	24.9 (76.8)	23.1 (73.6)	23.3 (73.9)	23.7 (74.7)	23.0 (73.4)	22.2 (72.0)	22.3 (72.1)	22.1 (71.8)	23.3 (73.9)
Daily mean °C (°F)	15.6 (60.1)	16.3 (61.3)	17.7 (63.9)	18.8 (65.8)	19.1 (66.4)	18.5 (65.3)	18.3 (64.9)	18.4 (65.1)	18.1 (64.6)	17.4 (63.3)	16.7 (62.1)	15.9 (60.6)	17.6 (63.6)
Mean daily minimum °C (°F)	9.3 (48.7)	9.7 (49.5)	10.7 (51.3)	12.6 (54.7)	13.4 (56.1)	14.0 (57.2)	13.4 (56.1)	13.1 (55.6)	13.3 (55.9)	12.6 (54.7)	11.2 (52.2)	9.7 (49.5)	11.9 (53.5)
Average precipitation mm (inches)	3 (0.1)	4 (0.2)	4 (0.2)	37 (1.5)	106 (4.2)	259 (10.2)	186 (7.3)	178 (7.0)	242 (9.5)	125 (4.9)	32 (1.3)	7 (0.3)	1,183 (46.7)
Source: Climate-Data.org

== Geographic location ==
It is completely surrounded by Chimaltenango Department municipalities:

== Notes and references ==
=== Bibliography ===
- Juarros, Domingo (1818). Compendio de la historia de la Ciudad de Guatemala (in Spanish). Guatemala: Ignacio Beteta.
- La Ilustración Guatemalteca (15 August 1896). "Nuestros Grabados: Natalia Górriz de Morales". La Ilustración Guatemalteca (in Spanish). I (2). Guatemala: Síguere, Guirola & Cía.
- Macías del Real, A. (15 March 1897). "Resumen Quincenal". La Ilustración Guatemalteca (in Spanish). 1 (16). Guatemala: Síguere, Guirola & Cía.
- Maudslay, Alfred Percival; Maudslay, Anne Cary (1899). A glimpse at Guatemala, and some notes on the ancient monuments of Central America (PDF). London, UK: John Murray.
