= Rodrigo de la Cadena =

Mexican singer, performer, songwriter, radio host and musician

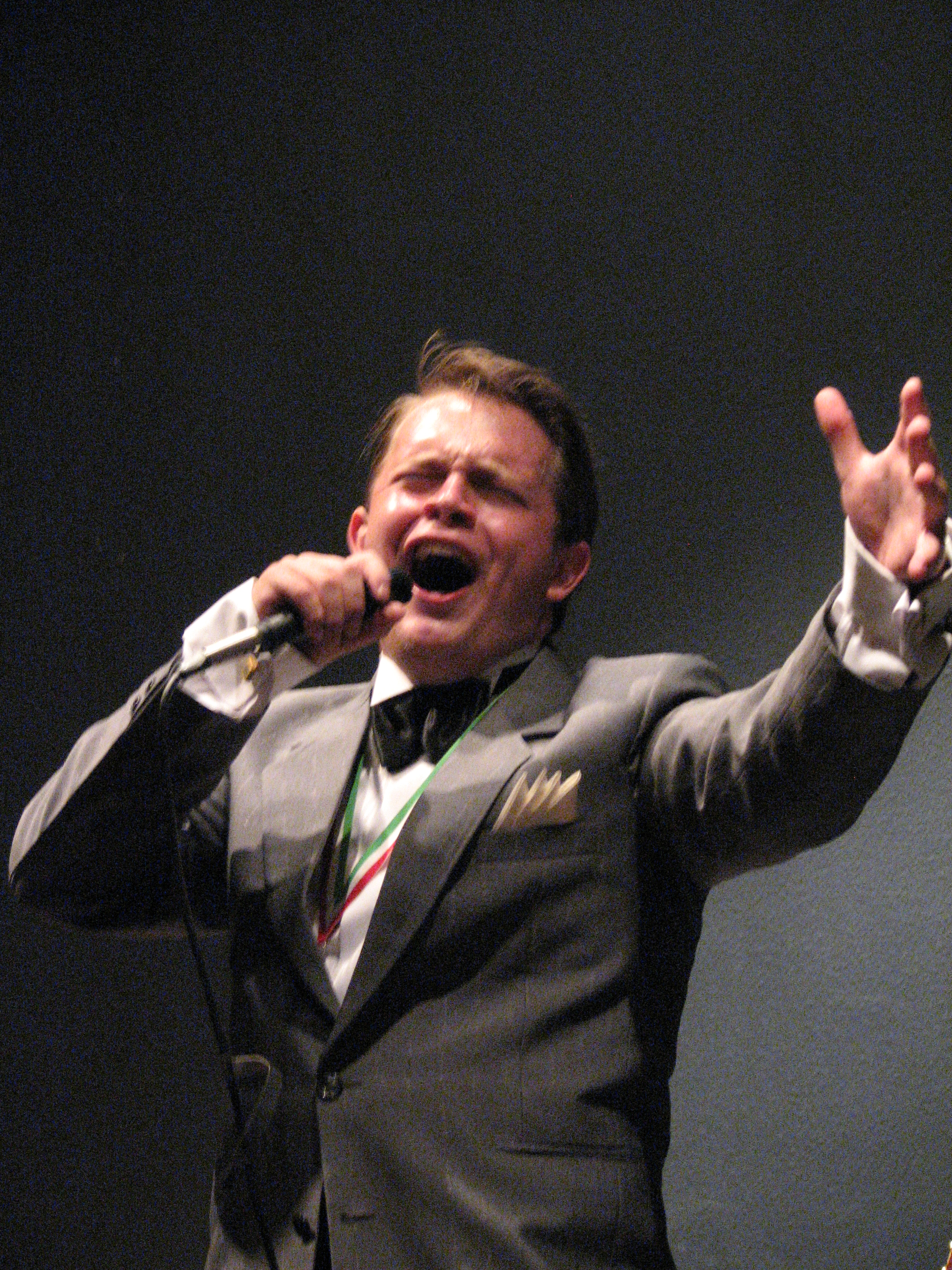
- Rodrigo de la Cadena performing at the Mexican Consulate in San Antonio, Texas (2007)

Background information
- Also known as: El Bolerista Mas Joven de Mexico, Nino Bolero
- Born: Rodrigo Álvarez de la Cadena; January 3, 1988 (age 38); Mexico
- Origin: Mérida, Yucatán, Mexican, Mexico
- Genres: Bolero, tango, big band, ranchera
- Occupations: Musician, songwriter, performer
- Instruments: Vocals, piano, keyboards, guitar, accordion, great highland bagpipe
- Years active: 2002–
- Labels: Continental, Orfeón and Independent
- Website: RodrigodelaCadena.com

Rodrigo Álvarez de la Cadena (born 3 January 1988) is a Mexican singer, performer, songwriter, radio host and musician. He is best known for his performances with a variety of worldwide artists and performers. He is also the host of a live radio show in which he performs and introduces audiences to his music.

== Biography ==
Rodrigo de la Cadena is a young artist whose repertoire is the Golden Age of romantic music (Agustín Lara, Gonzalo Curiel, María Grever, Los Panchos, Pedro Vargas, Amparo Montes, and Álvaro Carrillo), and performs Bolero music, performing more than 900 songs as well as his own original material.

Rodrigo not only has had the professional support of artists like Armando Manzanero, Roberto Cantoral, Lucho Gatica, Carlos Lico, Imelda Miller, Enrique Chia, Gualberto Castro, Chamin Correa, the late Pepe Jara, José José, among others.

Rodrigo hosts a radio show "nuevamente... bolero" which airs every Saturday from 9:00 p.m. to 11:00 p.m. on Radio Trece 1290 am. This station has a broad reach throughout the Mexican Republic, offering two hours of romance and memories of romantic bolero music with special guests every night.

He has performed in Mexico City's stages such as the National Auditorium, Metropolitan Theatre, Libanes Theatre, Universidad Nacional Autónoma de México (UNAM), La Salle University; as well as in hotels and night clubs in Mexico City such as The Sheraton Hotel and The Mayan Palace Hotel, the Gabanna night club and the Bar Prim.

Rodrigo has recorded two official albums, the first one called "Nuevamente... El Bolero" which was recorded in the studios of the album's label Orfeón offers songs by the most influential songwriters of bolero music and contains 12 tracks which were chosen out of 30 studio recordings.

Rodrigo after quitting his label Orfeon goes back to his very first recordings with Alejandro Hernández and starts recording his second album "Boleros Con Orquesta" with his very own orquestra and releases it as independent.

"It has always been a dream to make a project of boleros in big band and specially putting it on record and with my very own orchestra, everything turned out even better that I expected", says the young artist who not only played piano, guitar and sang in every recording, but also produced the album and arranged the music. Throwing a little bit of poetry in this new album, Rodrigo lets his feelings show by reciting words of Amado Nervo and Martin Galas giving the album more romance.

Rodrigo not only has been invited to every International Festival Of Bolero that has happened in the last few years in the Mexican Republic but has been invited to perform in the same festival in countries like Ecuador, Cuba, Argentina, Panama, among others, offering several presentations in the most important stages these countries have to offer.

He also performed in Europe, and, in 2014, became the Grand Prix Winner of the International Festival of Arts Slavianski Bazaar in Vitebsk, Belarus.

Rodrigo is now doing presentations in Miami, San Antonio, Mérida, and Ecuador, as well as recording his third record which will include for the first time new original material written by Rodrigo as well as a duet with Carlos Lico.

== Discography ==
- Nuevamente... El Bolero (2005) – Orfeón Videovox
- Boleros con Orquesta (2007) – Discos Continental
- La Bohemia del Amor (2008) – Discos Continental
- Neobolero / Un loco como yo (2010) – Discos Continental
- Agustín Lara: La Hora Íntima (Vol.1) (2013) – Discos Continental
- Agustín Lara: La Hora Íntima (Vol.2) (2013) – Discos Continental
- Agustín Lara: La Hora Íntima (Vol.3) (2013) – Discos Continental
- El Bolero de mi vida: Cuando nace una canción (CD1) (2017) – Independiente
- El Bolero de mi vida: Boleros para extañarte mejor (CD2) (2017) – Independiente
- Lo que me piden mis amigos (2018) – Independiente
- En blanco y negro in duet with Argelia Fragoso (2021) – Grown in Media
