= Próspero Morales =

Guatemalan lawyer (1856–1898)

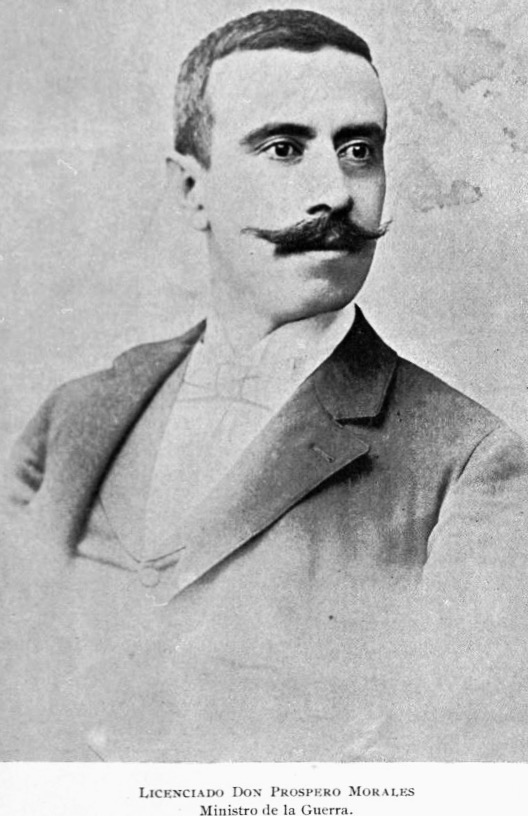

Secretary of Infrastructure and War
- In office March 15, 1892 – March 15, 1896
- President: José María Reina Barrios

Secretary of Public Instruction
- In office March 15, 1896 – March 5, 1897
- President: José María Reina Barrios

Personal details
- Born: 31 December 1856 San Marcos, Guatemala
- Died: 17 August 1898 (aged 41) Huehuetenango, Guatemala
- Spouse: Natalia Górriz
- Education: Escuela Facultativa de Derecho y Notaria del Centro

Próspero Morales (31 December 1856 – 17 August 1898) was a Guatemalan lawyer who served as Secretary of Infrastructure, War and Public Instruction during José María Reina Barrios administration. Two year after being in office, Morales married the well known Guatemalan teacher Natalia Górriz. Morales resigned as Secretary on 5 March 1897 in order to run for president for the upcoming presidential elections; however, due to the failure of the Exposición Centroamericana and the severe economic crisis that Guatemala was undergoing at the time, due to the plummeting of coffee and silver international prices, general Reina Barrios suspended the elections and forcibly extended his tenure until 1902. Morales then joined the revolution that was brewing in Quetzaltenango, but the rebels were defeated on 14 September 1897. After Reina Barrios assassination on 8 February 1898, he unsuccessfully tried to overthrow interim president Manuel Estrada Cabrera–who also had served as Secretary under Reina Barrios–but was repelled by the forces of former president Manuel Lisandro Barillas.

== Biography ==
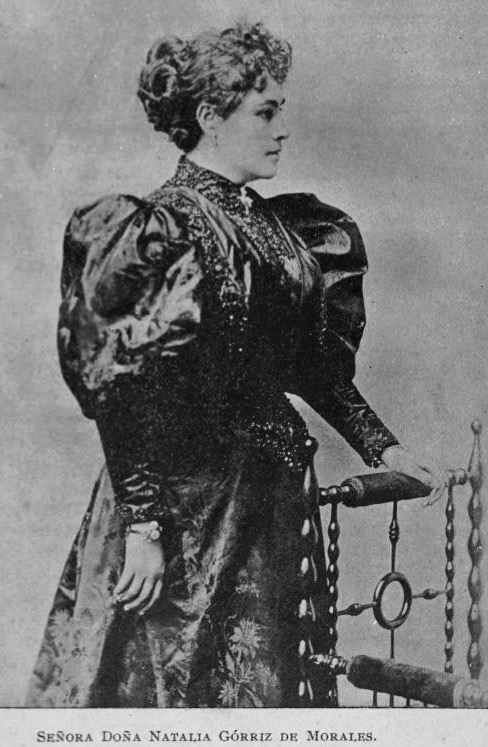
Natalia Górriz de Morales

In 1894, he married Natalia Górriz, who put her successful teaching and administrative career on hold to focus on her family. In January 1897, some rebellions started against Reina Barrios; after a mild battle, a group of invaders were defeated and their leaders were taken prisoners, judged and summarily executed on the same day. The opposition press was also critical of the president, accusing him of tyranny given that he had not allowed opposition political parties to prosper.

On 5 March 1897, Morales resigned as Secretary of Public Instruction in order to run for president in the upcoming elections. Opposition newspaper La República editors accused the government–and particularly Próspero Morales, former Secretary of Infrastructure, and president Reina Barrios–of wasting the few resources the country had trying to do all their projects at once: besides the Northern Railroad–which in case of had been the only project built would have brought considerable benefits to the country–boulevards, parks, squares, public buildings, and luxurious office buildings had been built as well, not to mention the three millions pesos wasted on the failed Exposición Centroamericana.

On 31 May 1897, the president dissolved the National Assembly and by August the situation was critical. Próspero Morales moved with his family to San Marcos and joined the revolutions that rose against Reina Barrios in Quetzaltenango.

== Death ==
After the September Quetzaltenango Revolution of 1897 failed, Morales and Górriz fled Guatemala and moved into Tapachula, Mexico where he learned that former Secretary of the Interior Manuel Estrada Cabrera had been appointed as interim president after Reina Barrios was murdered on 8 February 1898, Próspero Morales made the decision to be a presidential candidate in the 1898 elections. However, when he realized that Estrada Cabrera was using his position to ridge the elections, Morales went to Mexico City to recruit people for an invasion to Guatemala. Back in Tapachula we received support from colonels Rodrigo Castilla and Víctor López, who lived on the Guatemalan side of the border, in San Marcos–where Morales was born. On 22 July 1898, approximately 1500 rebels entered Guatemala from Mexico equipped with Mauser rifles to end Estrada Cabrera regime, but their adventure was swiftly neutralized, as Estrada Cabrera sent twelve thousand troops to stop them, declared Martial Law and secured the help of a British navy ship to attack the Port of Ocós if needed. The commander in chief of the Guatemalan Army was former president Manuel Lisandro Barillas Bercián, who defeated the rebels in Vado Ancho on 5 August of that year. After the invasion failure, Morales followers split; some of them went back to Mexico while a few stayed with him, until he surrendered on 14 August. He eventually died on 17 August.
