= Evolución Femenina =

Peruvian women's rights organization

Evolución Femenina (Women's Evolution) was a Peruvian women's rights organization founded in 1914. It was the first women's rights organisation in Peru.

== History ==
In 1911, María Jesús Alvarado Rivera attended the First International Women's Congress in Argentina. Upon her return to Lima in Peru, she started her feminist activism by giving the first feminist speeches in Peru. In 1914, she founded the Evolución Femenina, which was the first women's organisation in Peru.

The organisation campaigned for women's civil rights. It wished to provide more educational and professional opportunities for women, and founded a Moral School Workshop in order to combat prostitution by providing an opportunity for poor women to support themselves by education to other professions. It wished to change the Civil Code, and lobbied the government to allow women to hold public posts, such as the post of directors of public welfare societies. In 1915, the Chamber of Representatives finally allowed women to become committee members of public welfare societies, but Evolución Femenina was forced to continue fighting until 1922, when this was put in to law. It was an important achievement, since women had until then been entirely barred from any form of public service and was not even visible in public life within charity.

The Evolución Femenina was met with worse hostility and more difficulty than its counterparts in Argentine, Chile and Brazil. Educated professional middle-class women were mostly colored, and upper-class women mostly white, and were not willing to unite. The influential white upper-class women were convent educated and largely opposed to feminism, and they founded the Union Catolica (Catholic Women's League) in opposition to Evolución Femenina.

In 1923, the chairperson María Jesús Alvarado Rivera founded the Peruvian National Women's Council upon the wish of Carrie Chapman Catt and became its secretary. The Women's Council was an Umbrella organization of the women's groups that had formed in Peru after 1914. In 1924, she asked the Peruvian National Women's Council on behalf of the Evolución Femenina if they should campaign for a reform of the Civil Code, women's civil rights, equality before the law and the rights of married women to control their property. This was strongly opposed by the Union Catolica, and resulted in María Jesús Alvarado Rivera being arrested and banished from Peru.

The activity of the Peruvian women's movement between 1924 and 1955, in the form of the Peruvian National Women's Council, was modest, and women's suffrage was introduced in Peru in 1955 without much agitation for it by the women's movement.
