= Natalia Górriz =

Guatemalan writer and professor (b. 1868)

Natalia Górriz de Morales
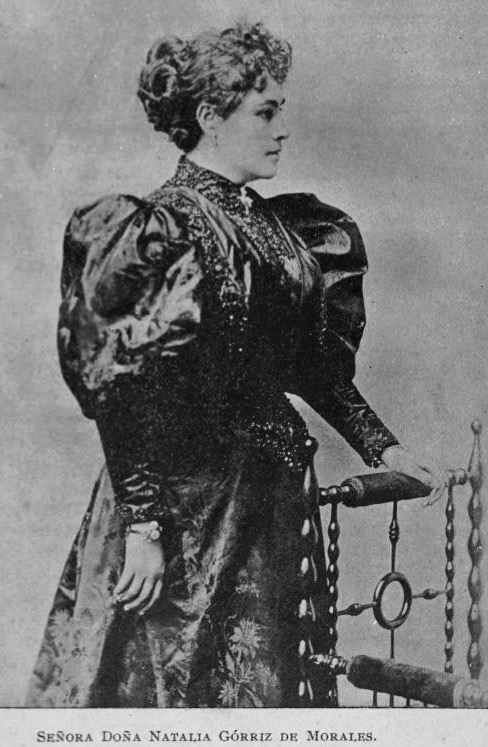
- Natalia Gorriz in 1896
- Born: July 21, 1868; Chimaltenango, Guatemala

Signature
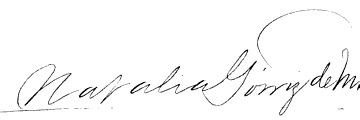

Natalia Górriz de Morales (Chimaltenango, 21 July 1868 – ?) was a Guatemalan teacher, pedagogue, and the founder of the Instituto Normal Central para Señoritas (the Central Normal Institute for Young Ladies) in 1888. In 1892, the government of General José María Reina Barrios promoted her to the post of Inspector General of Girls' Schools in Guatemala City. She wrote a book dedicated to Christopher Columbus in honor of that year's fourth centenary of his landing. Her teaching career was put on hold when she married Próspero Morales, in 1894, but after his death in 1898, she started teaching again.

== Biography ==
Górriz de Morales graduated from Instituto Belén in 1884 with a teacher diploma, and the next year she also obtained a high school diploma. Shortly after graduating she became principal of the only complementary school that existed in Guatemala City at the time under then Secretary of Public Instruction, Antonio Batres Jáuregui and eventually moved to the Instituto Belén faculty where she taught Pedagogy and Grammar with a method that she invented and that kept her students interested in the class and allowed them to reach a professional level even before graduating as teachers.

Górriz lobbied for and eventually got that the government of general Manuel Lisandro Barillas Bercián on 28 June 1888 decreed the creation of the Escuela Normal de Señoritas (Normal School for girls) which began started working in the old instituto Belén. In 1891 was named school principal and in 1892 was promoted to General Inspector of Elementary Public Instruction in Guatemala City. She was also president of the Guatemalan Teachers Central Academy and a member of the Madrid Geographic Society.

In 1894, she married then Secretary of Infrastructure and War, Próspero Morales and left her career to focus on her family.

=== Próspero Morales resignation ===
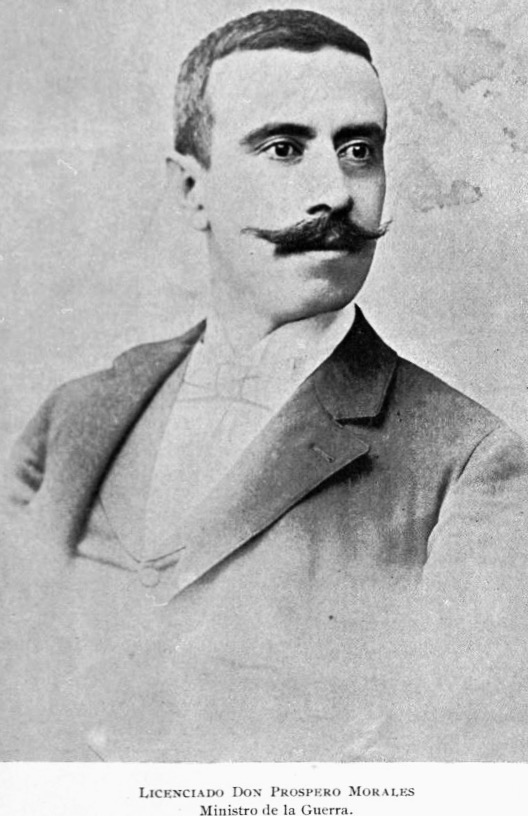
Próspero Morales, Natalia Górriz husband

But her marriage with Morales was soon going to undergo serious difficulties; in January 1897, some rebellions started against Reina Barrios; after a mild battle, a group of invaders were defeated and their leaders were taken prisoners, judged and summarily executed on the same day. The opposition press was also critical of the president, accusing him of tyranny given that he had not allowed opposition political parties to prosper.

On 5 March 1897, her husband Próspero Morales resigned as Secretary of Public Instruction in order to participate as a presidential candidate in the upcoming elections. Opposition newspaper La República editors accused the government -and particularly Próspero Morales, former Secretary of Infrastructure, and president Reina Barrios- of wasting the few resources the country had trying to do all their projects at once: besides the Northern Railroad -which in case of had been the only project built would have brought considerable benefits to the country- boulevards, parks, squares, public buildings, and luxurious office buildings had been built as well, not to mention the three millions pesos wasted on the failed Exposición Centroamericana.

On 31 May 1897 the president dissolved the National Assembly and by August the situation was critical. Próspero Morales moved with Górriz and his family to San Marcos and joined the revolutions that rose against Reina Barrios in Quetzaltenango.

=== Próspero Morales death ===
After the September Quetzaltenango Revolution of 1897 failed, Morales and Górriz fled Guatemala and moved into Tapachula, Mexico where he learned that former Secretary of the Interior Manuel Estrada Cabrera had been appointed as interim president after Reina Barrios was murdered on 8 February 1898, Próspero Morales made the decision to be a presidential candidate in the 1898 elections. However, when he realized that Estrada Cabrera was using his position to ridge the elections, Morales went to Mexico City to recruit people for an invasion to Guatemala. Back in Tapachula we received support from colonels Rodrigo Castilla and Víctor López, who lived on the Guatemalan side of the border, in San Marcos -where Morales was born-. On 22 July 1898, approximately 1500 rebels entered Guatemala from Mexico equipped with Mauser rifles to end Estrada Cabrera regime, but their adventure was swiftly neutralized, as Estrada Cabrera sent twelve thousand troops to stop them, declared Martial Law and secured the help of a British navy ship to attack the Port of Ocós if needed. The commander in chief of the Guatemalan Army was former president Manuel Lisandro Barillas Bercián, who defeated the rebels in Vado Ancho on 5 August of that year. After the invasion failure Morales followers split; some of them went back to Mexico while a few stayed with him, until he surrendered on 14 August. He eventually died on 17 August.

=== Restarting her teaching career ===
After the death of her husband, she published her book Compedio de geografía descriptiva (Descriptive Geography handbook) in 1904 and then was named director of the International School for Girls, where the Guatemalan elite sent their daughters to get an education.

In 1922, the Pan American Feminist Congress took place in Baltimore in the United States and twenty Latin American congress sent their delegates; in the Congress it was evident the enormous inequality between the American delegates their Latin American counterparts, as well as the preeminence of the Americans on all the topics and the negative attitude some of them had over Latin America. After noticing this, Mexican writer and philanthropist Elena Arizmendi, who attended the Congress as observer, announced the formation of a Spanish and Hispanic American Women League -or Women of the Race League- which started in 1923; in Guatemala, professor Górriz de Morales was the League delegate.

When specialized Kindergarten teaching formally began in Guatemala on 28 June 1928, professor Górriz de Morales was among the first batch of instructors who served pro bono.
