= García Granados =

García Granados may refer to:

- Jorge García Granados (1900–1961), Guatemalan politician and diplomat, grandson of Miguel García Granados
- María García Granados y Saborío (1860–1878), daughter of Miguel García García Granados
- María Josefa García Granados (1796–1848), Spanish-Guatemalan intellectual, writer, journalist and poet; sister of Miguel García Granados
- Miguel García Granados (1809–1878), president of Guatemala
