= Miles Rock =

American astronomer (1840–1901)

- Born: October 10, 1840; Ephrata, Pennsylvania, U.S.
- Died: January 29, 1901 (aged 60); Setzimaj, Alta Verapaz Department, Guatemala
- Resting place: Guatemala City General Cemetery, Guatemala City, Guatemala
- Education: Lehigh University; Franklin & Marshall College
- Scientific career
- Fields: Geology

Miles Rock (October 10, 1840 – January 29, 1901) was an American civil engineer, geologist and astronomer. He was part of the first graduating class of Lehigh University in 1869. He assisted Benjamin Apthorp Gould in the creation of the Observatorio Astronómico de Córdoba in Argentina between 1870 and 1873. He worked on the Wheeler Survey which mapped parts of the western United States from 1878 to 1879 and as Chief of the Guatemala Boundary Commission from 1883 to 1898 which defined the disputed Guatemala–Mexico border.

== Early life and education ==
He was born in Ephrata, Pennsylvania, on October 10, 1840. He was the youngest of nine children. His father died when Rock was only five years old and he was raised by a Mennonite farmer. At age 14, he moved to Lancaster and worked in a book store. He attended the local public schools and Lancaster High School. He attended Franklin & Marshall College but left early to serve in the American Civil War. He served in the 1st Pennsylvania Reserve Regiment as secretary to the commanding officer and in the U.S. Signal Corps.

After the war, he enrolled in the first class of the newly founded Lehigh University. He served as chairman of The Junto literary society and worked with Henry Sturgis Drinker to survey and map the Friedensville Zinc Mine in Center Valley, Pennsylvania. He graduated in 1869 with a degree in civil engineering and worked as an instructor of math and mineralogy at Lehigh for one year after graduation.

== Career ==
Rock and three others, including John M. Thome and William Morris Davis, assisted Benjamin Apthorp Gould in the creation of the Observatorio Astronómico de Córdoba in Argentina between 1870 and 1873. While there, Gould, Rock and others created the Uranometria Argentina, which formalized the southern astronomical constellations.

Trained as a civil engineer, he held multiple roles that leveraged his skills in different ways. From 1874 to 1877, he worked with the United States Hydrographic Office, mapping the West Indies and Central America. He was part of the Wheeler Survey between 1878 and 1879 mapping western states and territories. He worked at the United States Naval Observatory as an assistant astronomer under Simon Newcomb from 1879 to 1883. In 1882, he participated in the observation of the Transit of Venus from Santiago, Chile.

He was a member of the Anthropological Society of Washington and in 1879 made presentations titled "Indian pictographs in New Mexico" and "On the Effacing Power of Tropical Forest-growth in Trinidad Island".

From 1883 to 1898, he was chief of the Guatemala Boundary Commission, whose goal was to clearly define and map the contentious boundary between Guatemala and Mexico.

== Personal life ==
In 1870, he married Susan Clarkson and together they had a son, Alfred Rock, and a daughter, Amy Cordoba Rock.

Rock died on January 29, 1901, on his coffee farm in Guatemala due to severe food poisoning. He was interred in the Guatemala City General Cemetery in Guatemala City with public honors under the supervision of President Manuel Estrada Cabrera in recognition of his service to Guatemala. His son retrieved his belongings which were passed down through his descendants until they were donated to Lehigh University in 2021.

== Publications ==
- Telegraphic Determination of Longitudes in Mexico and Central America and on the West Coast of South America, Washington: Government Printing Office, 1885
- Guatemala Forests, The American Naturalist, Vol. XXII, No. 257, pages 385-399, May 1888
