= María García Granados y Saborío =

Guatemalan socialite

María García Granados
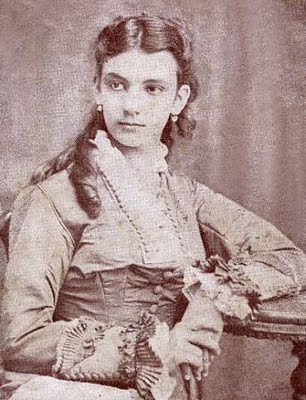
- Daguerreotype of María García Granados
- Born: 1860; Guatemala City, Guatemala
- Died: May 10,1878 (aged 17–18); Guatemala City, Guatemala
- Occupation: socialite
- Known for: Inspired Cuban poet and hero José Martí the poem La Niña de Guatemala. She was both granddaughter and niece of the Guatemalan poet and journalist María Josefa García Granados.
- Parent: General Miguel García Granados

María García Granados y Saborío (1860 – May 10, 1878), also known as La Niña de Guatemala ("The Girl of Guatemala"), was a Guatemalan socialite, daughter of General Miguel García Granados, who was President of Guatemala from 1871 to 1873 and whose house served as a gathering for the top artists and writers of the time. María was also niece of María Josefa García Granados, an influential poet and journalist of the time. (Note: At that time, among distinguished families marriages between close relatives were more frequent.) When Cuban poet and patriot José Martí came to Guatemala in 1877, he was invited to General Garcia Granados gatherings and fell in love with Maria there, but could not act on this love because he was already engaged to marry Ms. Carmen Zayas Bazán. María died in 1878, shortly after learning that Martí had married, and he immortalized her in his 1891 poem La Niña de Guatemala.

== History ==
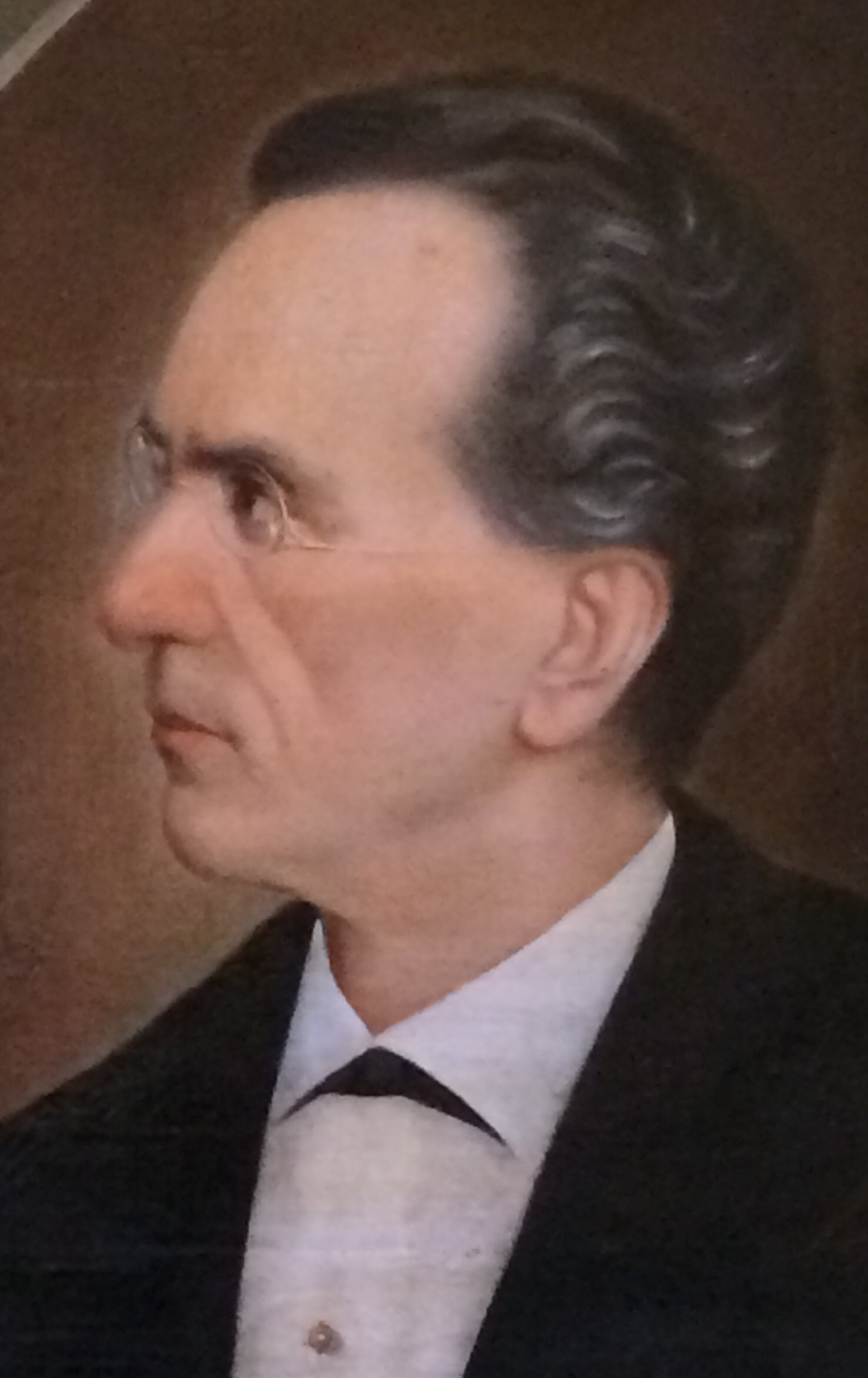
General Miguel García Granados, leader of the Liberal Reform of 1871 and President of Guatemala from 1871 to 1873. He was María's father.

Amo el bello desorden, muy más bello
Desde que tú, la espléndida María,
Tendiste en tus espaldas el cabello,
¡Como una palma al destocarse haría!

Desempolvo el laúd, beso tu mano
Y a ti va alegre mi canción de hermano.
¡Cuán otro el canto fuera
Si en hebras de tu trenza se tañera!

— José Martí
May 1877

Martí came to Guatemala at age 24 from Mexico, where he had professional success as a journalist and writer and had reunited with his family after his deportation from Spanish Cuba (1871–1875). In Guatemala he met the dramatic actress Eloisa Agüero and eventually got engaged to his future wife, Carmen. Actually, Martí arrived to Central America after becoming disappointed with the authoritarian Mexican rule of Porfirio Díaz. (Note: Eventually, he also became disappointed with the Liberal government of Justo Rufino Barrios.) Upon arriving to Guatemala he wrote a critical view of the inferiority that women had been subject to in that country: in an article entitled 'The new codes ", published in Progreso, on April 22, 1877 he made the following reflection upon request of Joaquin Macal -Secretary of Foreign Affairs of Guatemala at the time-: "What is the first of the colonial ballasts from the deposed legislation? The absolute power that bestial husbands had over the venerable wife; it practically gives husbands parental rights over women. The law of heaven, is not capable of knowing the law of land?" (Note: Marti here criticizes the conservative legislation of previous governments in Guatemala, which had a strong relationship with the Holy See since the Concordat of 1854.) So he focused on the Guatemalan ladies' walking indolent, glances caste, dressed as women of the village, with braids lying on the mantle, they call shawl; hand counting idle floating mantle tips infant joys or sorrows of his first mistress'; and when found Maria -more cosmopolitan and illustrated- he was immediately infatuated with her. It appears that María was not the standard shy and vulnerable Guatemalan girl: Guatemalan publications of the time talk about her relatively active participation as a musician and singer outside her home, in public artistic activities organized by societies and institutions where she coincided with Martí. Apparently she was a very popular youth within the city's high society of the time; María was then the footsteps of her aunt and grandmother Maria Josefa, who had died in 1848 and had been a superb poet and journalist, very influential in the Conservative governments of Guatemala.

Martí was known in Guatemala as "Doctor Torrente" due to his great speaking ability and charisma and also taught María at the Central American Academy for Girls June 1877, months after his arrival in this Central American nation in March 1877.

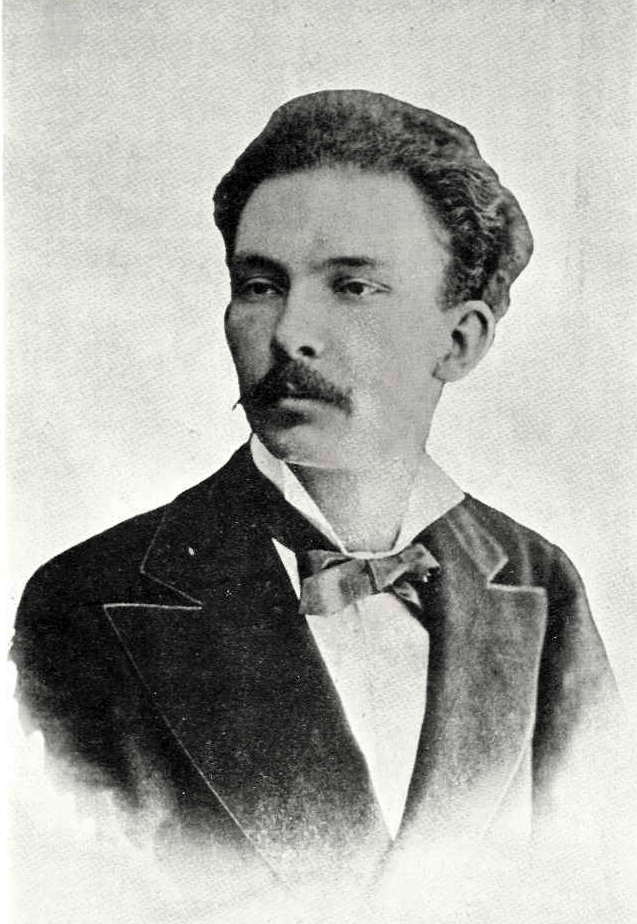
José Martí in 1875. In 1877 the Cuban poet and politician came to Guatemala from Mexico and courted María García Granados. When Martí married another lady to whom he was already engaged in 1878, Maria died shortly after. In 1891, Martí immortalized her in poem La Niña de Guatemala

Here are some descriptions of Maria Garcia Granados:

- MB Martínez: "She was a young interesting. I took Martí to a costume ball, that occurred in the García Granados household, two days after [first] arriving to Guatemala; we were both standing in one of the beautiful lounges, watching couples parade [when we saw coming] arm in arm two ladies sisters. Martí then asked me: "Who's that girl dressed like an Egyptian?" "It is Maria, daughter of General" [I said]. Then, I gallantly stopped her and introduced her to my friend and countryman Martí, and electrical sparks ignited "
- José María Izaguirre:" She was tall, slender and graceful: her hair was black as ebony, rich, crisp and smooth as silk; her face -without being supremely beautiful- was sweet and friendly; her deep black and melancholic eyes, veiled by long lashes, revealed an exquisite sensitivity. Her voice was gentle and harmonious, and their ways so gentle, it was not possible to treat her without falling in love for her. She also played piano admirably, and when her hand slipped with abandonment by the keyboard, she poured out notes that seemed out of her soul and impress her listeners' José María Izaguirre, a Cuban who lived in Guatemala at the time was principal of the then highly prestigious Central National High School for Boys and had appointed Marti as professor of literature and composition exercises. Besides dealing with teaching activities, Izaguirre, organized artistic and literary evenings which Martí attended frequently.It was there where he met Maria on April 21, 1877: then a gracious teenager, seven years younger than him.

Her father, General Miguel García Granados had been president a few years ago and enjoyed great prestige in the Guatemalan society during Barrios government; soon he became friends with the Cuban immigrant and often invited him home to play chess. In late 1877, Martí went to Mexico and returned until early next year, already married to Carmen. What happened after his marriage and return has been commented at length by those who witnessed the incident and by generations of Guatemalan and Cuban intellectuals afterwards.

== Death and legend ==
Six days ago you came back to Guatemala, and you have not come to see me yet. Why? Do not delay your visit; I do not hold a grudge against you, because you always talked honestly about your situation and your moral commitment to marry Miss Zayas Bazán. I beg you to come soon.

— Your Niña

On May 10, 1878 María García Granados y Saborio died, which would lead to a sad tale inspired by the frustrated love between the Cuban poet and national hero José Martí and her. Martí left his sadness reflected in the 'poem IX' of his Versos sencillos, which is titled La Niña de Guatemala. (Note: In most of the Versos sencillos Marti remembers personal events that occurred throughout his life localized in different countries through which he passed or did stay during his forced exile.) In addition to the verses of Martí, other documentation that partially clarify the episode include:

- Two other poems, which Martí devoted to María before her death
- Some evidence of common friends
- A small message that María sent to the Cuban when he returned married from Mexico
- A letter to his friend Manuel Mercado in which Marti painfully remembered María.
- A character in Marti's only novel.
Guatemala, 1877 (Note: Original in Spanish: Si en la fiesta teatral —corrido el velo— Desciende la revuelta escalinata, Su pie semeja cisne pequeñuelo Que el seno muestra de luciente plata. […] Quisiera el bardo, cuando al sol la mece, Colgarle al cuello esclavo los amores; / ¡Si se yergue de súbito, parece Que la tierra se va a cubrir de flores! ¡Oh! Cada vez que a la mujer hermosa Con fraternal amor habla el proscripto, Duerme soñando en la palmera airosa, Novia del Sol en el ardiente Egipto.)

| If in the theatrical festival -opened the veil- goes down the swirling staircase, Her foot seems like a tiny swan that its shining silver chest shows. [...] I would like to be the light, when the sun rocks her, | hang around her neck slave the loves; If she rises suddenly, it seems the earth will be covered with flowers Oh! Each time to the beautiful woman with brotherly love the proscript speaks sleep dreaming of the lovely lady, bride of the Sun in the ardent Egypt. |

By the time Martí managed to publish Versos sencillos in 1891, Carmen had left and took their son with her after a visit in New York City; (Note: By then, their relationship was quite strained and barely animated by the presence of little José Francisco.) Carmen sailed for Havana in secret, for which he requested the cooperation of the Spanish authorities, producing an irreversible separation and the final estrangement from his son.

Martí then wrote to a friend: "And to think I sacrificed poor thing, María, for Carmen, who has climbed the stairs of the Spanish consulate to beg for protection from me." Marti hinted in his Poema IX something more sinister than death from sadness: allegorically, he implies the suicide of the rejected lover:

Poem IX (Note: Original in Spanish: Quiero, a la sombra de un ala, contar este cuento en flor: la niña de Guatemala, la que se murió de amor. Eran de lirios los ramos; y las orlas de reseda y de jazmín; la enterramos en una caja de seda... Ella dio al desmemoriado una almohadilla de olor; él volvió, volvió casado; ella se murió de amor. Iban cargándola en andas obispos y embajadores; detrás iba el pueblo en tandas, todo cargado de flores... Ella, por volverlo a ver, salió a verlo al mirador; / él volvió con su mujer, ella se murió de amor. Como de bronce candente, al beso de despedida, era su frente -¡la frente que más he amado en mi vida!... Se entró de tarde en el río, la sacó muerta el doctor; dicen que murió de frío, yo sé que murió de amor. Allí, en la bóveda helada, la pusieron en dos bancos: besé su mano afilada, besé sus zapatos blancos. Callado, al oscurecer, me llamó el enterrador; nunca más he vuelto a ver a la que murió de amor.)

| I want under the shadow of a wing, tell this story in bloom: the Girl of Guatemala, the one who died of love There were bouquets of lilies;. and of silk the ornaments and of jazmine; we buried her in a box of silk ... She gave the forgetful a perfumed cloth; he returned, returned married; she died of love They were carrying her in procession bishops and ambassadors; going behind, the people in batches, all loaded with flowers ... She, to see him again, went to see him to the viewpoint; | he returned with his wife, she died of love. As of hot bronze the farewell kiss, was her forehead -¡Oh the forehead I've loved most in my life! ... By evening she went in the river the doctor took her out dead; they said that she died of cold, I know that she died of love There in the icy vault, they put her on two banks: I kissed her lovely hand I kissed her white shoes Quiet, after dark, the undertaker called me; I've never seen again the one who died of Love. |

The legend originated as a result of a straight interpretation of the poem. Although it persists, there is no documented evidence of sufficient weight able to prove that María García Granados attempted against her own life or even died product of a depressive psychological state. An interview with a descendant of the García Granados family, (Note: Sergio García Granados, 2008) sheds light on the family version -transmitted by oral tradition- that says that María, although with a cold, agreed to go swimming with her cousin, which was usual for them, perhaps to distract herself from the sadness in which she was plunged after the return of Martí. After the ride, María's condition worsened and she died from a disease of the airways that she was already suffering.

=== Posthumous tribute ===
The commemorative plaque unveiled in 2013 by the Cuban ambassador says in golden letters:

" I want under the shadow of a wing,
Tell this story in bloom:
La Niña de Guatemala,
The one that died of love

Also included is the image of the daughter of former President Miguel García Granados and the description:" María García Granados, La Nina de Guatemala "

— Ministry of Foreign Affairs of Cuba

After her death, several poems appeared in the Guatemalan press as a posthumous tribute, where the authors confess the admiration that she had awakened in them. José María Izaguirre, for example, proposed to strengthen the myth of death for love: "When Martí returned with Carmen he did not return to the general's house, for the feeling was deeply rooted in María's soul, and she was of those that easily forget. Her passion was locked in this dilemma: be satisfied, or die. Unable to get the first, he had only the second option left. Indeed, her nature was declining gradually, a continuous sigh consumed, and despite the care of the family and the efforts of science, after staying a few days in bed without uttering a complaint, her life extinguished like the scent of a lily ".

In 2013, on occasion of the 160th anniversary of José Martí's birth, the Cuban embassy in Guatemala located the tomb of Maria in the Guatemala City General Cemetery and in a special ceremony with Guatemalan diplomats unveiled a commemorative plaque to the girl Guatemala. To that could make this tribute, the Department of Cultural Heritage of Guatemala placed where rested the remains of the girl who fell in love with Cuban hero, and an account of how her remains ended up at Cementerio General was performed as she had initially been buried in the cemetery which was located in the back of the Metropolitan Cathedral, which was closed in 1881 for being in the center of the city, forcing families to move their deceased to the one that was built on the outskirts. In the tribute the Cuban ambassador made a comparison between the friendship and love that existed between María and Martí and the friendship among the peoples of Guatemala and Cuba.

=== Legends about her grave ===
After she was honoured in 2013, some Guatemala City General Cemetery staff members were interviewed and reported that even before the placement of the plaque, her tomb was one of the most visited in the Cemetery, especially by young Guatemalan ladies asking for her help in matters of love. They also reported stories about the apparitions of a sad looking young lady asking that Maria's grave should be decorated with flowers.

== Notes and references ==
=== Bibliography ===
- CubaMinRex (2013). "Embajada de Cuba en Guatemala rinde tributo a María García Granados". Ministerio de Relaciones Exteriores de Cuba (in Spanish). Cuba. Archived from the original on January 4, 2015.
- Izaguirre, José María (1953). "Homenaje a José Martí en el Centenario de su Nacimiento". Revista Cubana (in Spanish). La Habana, Cuba: Publicaciones del Ministerio de Educación, Dirección General de Cultura. Archived from the original on July 15, 2014.
- Martí, José (2010). La América Central. Obras completas (in Spanish). Vol. 13 (Crítica ed.). La Habana: Centro de Estudios Martianos.
- Martínez, MB (n.d.). "Viejos datos reverdecen la leyenda: Martí y la Niña". La Jiribilla (in Spanish). Archived from the original on July 14, 2014.
- Ripoll, C. (n.d.). La Niña de Guatemala, la vida íntima y secreta de José Martí (in Spanish). Nueva York: Dos Ríos. Archived from the original on July 16, 2001.
- Velásquez, Saray (2013). "María García Granados, la tumba más visitada". Siglo XXI (in Spanish). Guatemala. Archived from the original on January 5, 2015.
