= María Josefa García Granados =

Guatemalan writer and independence advocate (1796–1848)

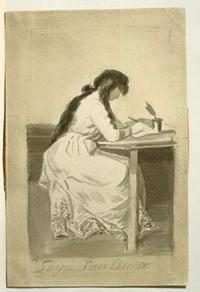
- Born: 10 July 1796; El Puerto de Santa María, Cadiz, Spain
- Died: 28 September 1848 (aged 52); Guatemala City
- Other names: Juan de las Viñas (Note: Garcia Granados used a male name to disguise because in the nineteenth century in Guatemala women typically only dedicated home); Pepita
- Occupations: poet, political journalist
- Writing career
- Notable works: A la ceiba de Amatitlán; Himno a la Luna (1830); La Resolución; A una hermosa joven-desgraciadamente enlazada con un achacoso viejo-; A una abeja; Plegaria; Despedida
- Website: María Josefa Garcia Granados

María Josefa García Granados y Zavala (10 July 1796 - 28 September 1848) was a Guatemalan intellectual, writer, journalist and poet of Spanish origin, and one of the greatest intellectual exponents of the independence of Guatemala, which was achieved in 1821. She was also a feminist ahead of her time, who with her strong and dominant character influenced Guatemalan culture. She was the sister of General Miguel García Granados, who was the first liberal president of Guatemala, and Adelaida García Granados, who was tutor of Petrona Álvarez, wife of General Rafael Carrera, lifelong conservative president of Guatemala. As his family was part of the Aycinena clan, they suffered exile and dispossession of their property by Francisco Morazán in 1829.

== Biography ==
María Josefa García Granados was born in El Puerto de Santa María, Spain. She came from an aristocratic family who had traveled to Spain but decided to return to Guatemala after the French invasion of the Iberian Peninsula. Her penchant for literature and journalism led her to participate in gatherings, get to know intellectuals and writers and even publish book of different genres. She was the sister of Miguel García Granados and Adelaida García Granados. (Note: González Davison 2008: Wife of conservative ideologue Luis Batres Juarros and tutor of Petrona Alvarez, wife of conservative President Rafael Carrera.) Best known to her friends and acquaintances as "Pepita", she married Ramón Saborio de la Villa from Nicaragua, with whom she shared marriage until death and bore him six children. She was known for her strong character and authority; because of this, María Josefa had friendships with the most influential men of her time, even before 1821 (Note: the year of the Guatemalan independence) she was attending famous gatherings at the home of José María Castilla, a priest born in Madrid, Spain.

Her brother was also her son-in-law, for it was customary at that time that among upper-class families, there were intermarriages; her brother Miguel married her eldest daughter, Cristina.

== Works ==
"Woman of independent genius, with a lot of ingenuity and mischief; with a gift to make verses and a lot of funny stories for her satirical pieces; she was what could be call an original entity, and a very dangerous acquaintance. God forbid one was the center of her attacks!"

— General Miguel García Granados

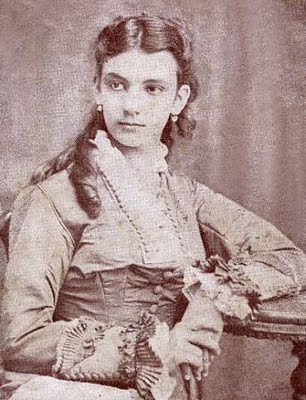
María García Granados y Saborío, daughter of general Miguel García Granados and niece/granddaughter of María Josefa. She fell in love with the Cuban hero and poet José Martí when he arrived to Guatemala in 1876, and her untimely death gave rise to the legend of La Niña de Guatemala. Due to the similarity in their names, she is often confused with María Josefa.

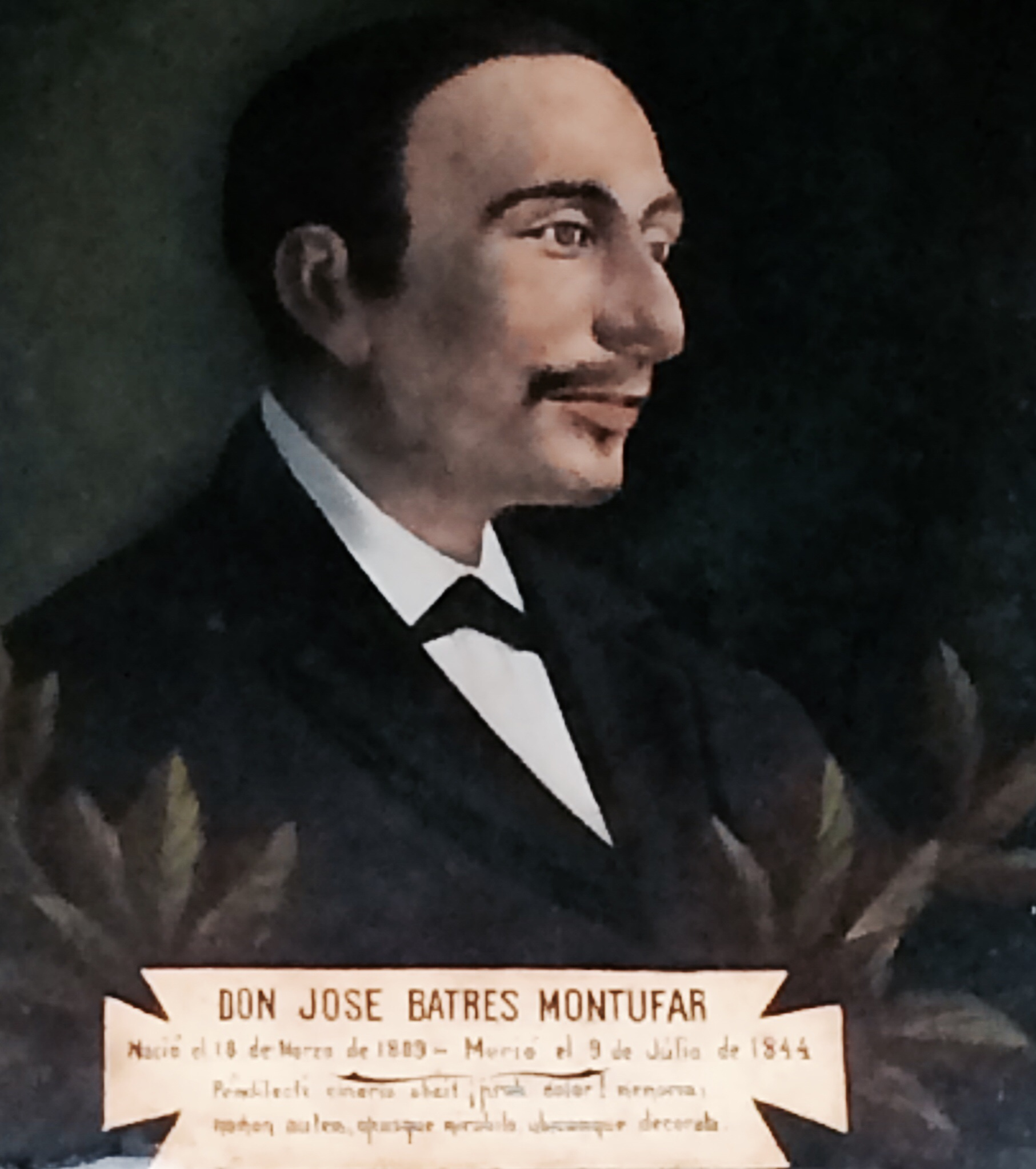
Guatemalan Poet José Batres Montúfar, piano pupil and friend of María Josefa García Granados.

About her literature, Ana María Urruela de Quezada -member of the Guatemalan Language Academy- said that "her literary body of work is historically significant, because her portraits, satirical pieces, and letters were able to portray, without romanticisms those characters and episodes related to the cultural and political elite of that forgone era". To García Granados, poetry was an instrument that she used to leave behind live testimonials of that turbulent time of bitter rivalry between the liberal criollos led by Francisco Morazán and the peasant revolts led by Rafael Carrera and unwillingly supported by the conservative criollos. Poetry allowed her to talk about love and romantic topics, while at the same time, she was able to talk about certain symbolic elements.

Rubén Darío in 1887 declared her "the most ingenious woman Central America has produced."

=== Poetry ===
She also wrote and read poetry; among her works are: A la ceiba de Amatitlán, Hymn to the Moon (1830), The Resolution, To a Beautiful Girl -- Unfortunately Engaged to an Old Man, To a Bee, Plegaria, and Farewell. She also translated some of Byron's verses and worked on historic poetry.

=== Cien veces una (A hundred times one) ===
During Dr. Mariano Gálvez tenure as head of the Guatemalan State, some liberals in El Salvador wrote in a newspaper called Ten times ten; in turn, García Granados and her friend José Batres Montúfar created a newspaper called A hundred times one (Cien Veces Una).

== Death ==
According to what is said by textbooks and critics, there is a legend about Josefa and Montufar's death: both were firm believer in life after death and therefore, they made a pact and agreed that the first one to die would come back and tell whoever was left behind whether there was or not a hell. Allegedly, they made the pact in 1844, a few months before Batres died. It has been said that Batres did come back and told María Josefa: "There is indeed a hell, Pepita!" This would explain why she quit writing in her latest years and withdrew from social life, living instead a very pious life.

She died four years later, on 28 September 1848. Curiously, she was buried in a tomb separated only by a wall to that of Ignacio Gómez, bitter enemy of García Granados in life.

== Additional information ==
- She was a personal friend of Pedro Molina, José Francisco Barrundia, Dieguez, José Cecilio del Valle, Mariano Gálvez, Cordova, several Aycinena clan members, José Milla y Vidaurre and Rafael Carrera.
- She was aunt -and also grandmother- of María García Granados y Saborío, whom the famous Cuban poet José Martí immortalized in his poem of 1891: La Niña de Guatemala. Because of their similar name, they are often confused, but her niece, although educated, did not have the intellectual capacity of María Josefa.

=== See also ===
- Justo Rufino Barrios
- Miguel Garcia Granados

== Notes and references ==
=== Bibliography ===
- Escobedo, Juan Carlos (2006). "María Josefa García Granados". Página de Literatura Guatemalteca (in Spanish).
- González Davison, Fernando (2008). La montaña infinita; Carrera, caudillo de Guatemala (in Spanish). Guatemala: Artemis y Edinter. ISBN 978-84-89452-81-7.
- Hernández de León, Federico (1930). El libro de las efemérides (in Spanish). Vol. III. Guatemala: Tipografía Sánchez y de Guise.
- Martí, José (2010). "La América Central". Obras Completas (in Spanish). 13 (Crítica ed.). La Habana: Centro de Estudios Martianos.
- Méndez, Francisco Alejandro (July 2013). "Pepita García Granados, La poetisa irreverente". Blog Otro Lunes (in Spanish). Archived from the original on 15 April 2021.
- Móbil, J. (2011). Personajes Históricos de Guatemala (in Spanish). Guatemala: Serviprensa, S. A.
- Stephens, John Lloyd; Catherwood, Frederick (1854). Incidents of travel in Central America, Chiapas, and Yucatan. London, United Kingdom: Arthur Hall, Virtue and Co.
- Woodward, Ralph Lee Jr. (2002). "Rafael Carrera y la creación de la República de Guatemala, 1821–1871". Serie monográfica (in Spanish) (12). CIRMA y Plumsock Mesoamerican Studies. ISBN 0-910443-19-X. Archived from the original on 1 March 2019.
- — (1993). Rafael Carrera and the Emergence of the Republic of Guatemala, 1821-1871. Athens, Georgia: University of Georgia Press. ISBN 9780820343600.
