= Miguel García Granados =

Spanish-born Guatemalan politician and military general

General of Division Miguel Garcia Granados
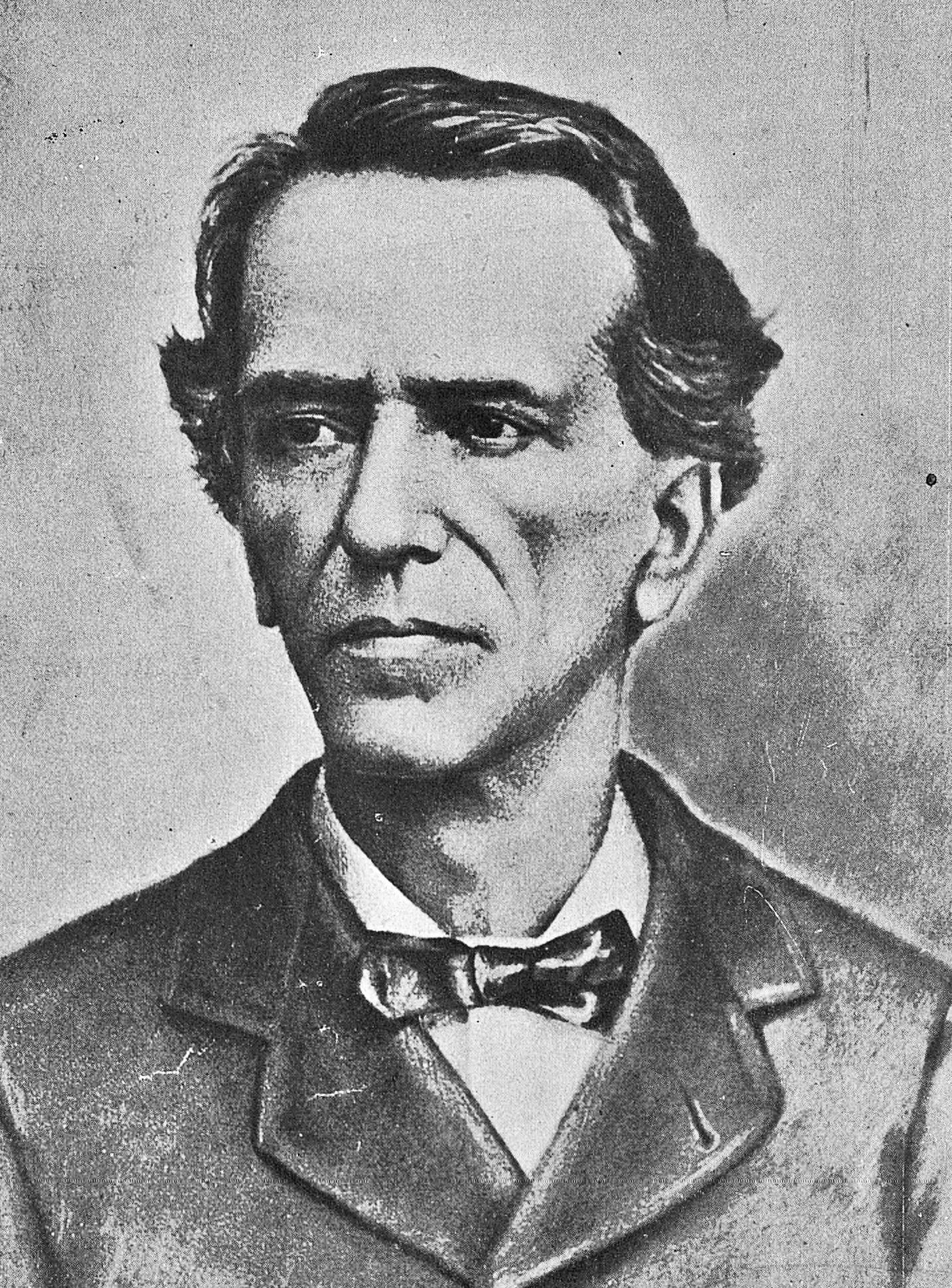

President of Guatemala
- In office 30 June 1871 – 4 June 1873
- Deputy: Justo Rufino Barrios
- Preceded by: Vicente Cerna y Cerna
- Succeeded by: Justo Rufino Barrios

Personal details
- Born: Miguel García Granados y Zavala; 29 September 1809 Puerto de Santa María, Spain
- Died: 8 September 1878 (aged 68) Guatemala City, Guatemala
- Party: Liberal
- Children: María García Granados y Saborío

Miguel García Granados y Zavala (29 September 1809 – 8 September 1878) was a Spanish-born Guatemalan politician and military general who served as President of Guatemala from 1871 to 1873.

== Early life ==
García Granados was born in El Puerto de Santa María, Spain. As a young adolescent, he was brought to Central America. He was a member of a wealthy military family. At age twenty-three, Granados visited South America, Europe and the cities of New York and Philadelphia in the US. He completed his schooling in London.

He was the brother of Guatemalan writer María Josefa García Granados.

== Career ==
García Granados was known as a moderate liberal. He compromised with Rafael Carrera, and attempted to get along with his successor Vicente Cerna. Sympathetic with the revolt against the government, García Granados fled to exile and was supported by Guatemalan liberals. After returning to Guatemala, García Granados became the leader of the revolution against Cerna, eventually becoming known as its philosopher. García Granados played a key part in the regime of Justo Rufino Barrios, the founder of "the army of 45 men". He served as a provisional president from 1871 to 1873 after the liberal victory of Guatemala City. García Granados wanted to regularize the government by constructing a lawful regime. In 1872, Guatemala invaded Honduras, where García Granados decreed freedom of the press and expelled the Jesuits.

García Granados and his successor Barrios support multiple liberal revolts. During his presidency, García Granados created the Guatemalan flag by decree, which remains almost identical to his 1871 version. Garcia Granados supported education and the arts. In 1871 he invited Italian conductor Pietro Visoni to stay in Guatemala and become the director of the main military band. Visoni later founded the Martial Symphony Band and the School of Substitutes (Escuela de Substitutos), the first formal music conservatory in Central America. After García Granados stepped down, Barrios served as president until the mid-1870s.

== Retirement ==
García Granados retired from public life to write articles for Guatemalan magazines and newspapers; accounts of the time when he was the leader of the liberal forces and as president; an essay about monetary policy and two volumes of memoirs.

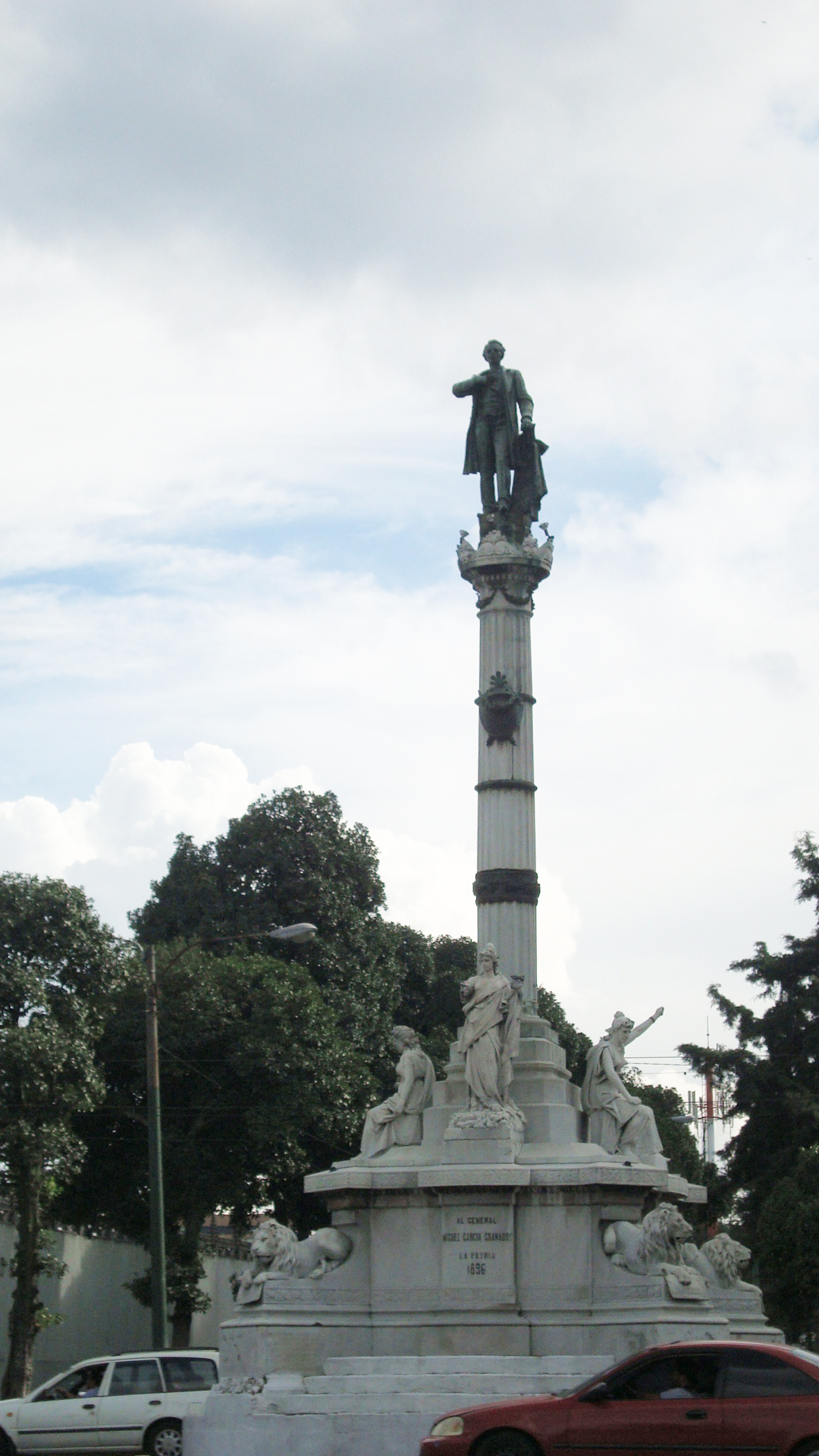
García Granados Monument. Located on Avenida La Reforma, in front of the old Guatemalan Military School.

In 1877, he arrived in Guatemala José Martí, who started teaching in the just founded Instituto Nacional Central para Varones and Escuela Normal para Varones. In those days, the high schools' faculty included Spaniard politician Valero Pujol, German engineer Edwin Rockstroh and Cuban poet José Joaquín Palma, who used to gather for intellectual conversations. In one of those meetings, Martí met María García Granados y Saborío, general García Granados' daughter. Despite his engagement to a Cuban woman, Martí started visiting the Garcia Granados residency, where he frequently played chess with the general and paid his respects to María. María fell in love with Martí, but after a sudden trip to Mexico in early 1878, came back to Guatemala already married. A few weeks after Marti left for good, María died, followed shortly thereafter by her father. In 1891, Martí wrote a poem in her memory, named La Niña de Guatemala, (Note: The Girl from Guatemala.) in which he implies that she died from love.

== Death ==
Garcia Granados died on 8 September 1878 at the age of 69. Garcia Granados was laid to rest in the old San Juan de Dios Cemetery. (Note: That cemetery was located where the San Juan de Dios Hospital in downtown Guatemala City stands today.)

In 1894, his remains were transferred to a monument erected in his honor at the new General Cemetery.

His portrait appears on the 10 Quetzales bank note.

== See also ==
- Rafael Carrera
- Vicente Cerna
- Justo Rufino Barrios
- María Josefa García Granados
- Alejandro M. Sinibaldi
- Manuel Lisandro Barillas
- José Martí

== Notes and references ==
=== Sources ===
- Jones, Christopher L. Guatemala: Past and Present. Russell & Russell, 1966
- Rosenthal, Mario. Guatemala: The story of an emergent Latin American Democracy. Twayne, 1962

Preceded by Vicente Cerna	President of Guatemala; 1871–1873	Succeeded by Justo Rufino Barrios
