= History of Guatemala =

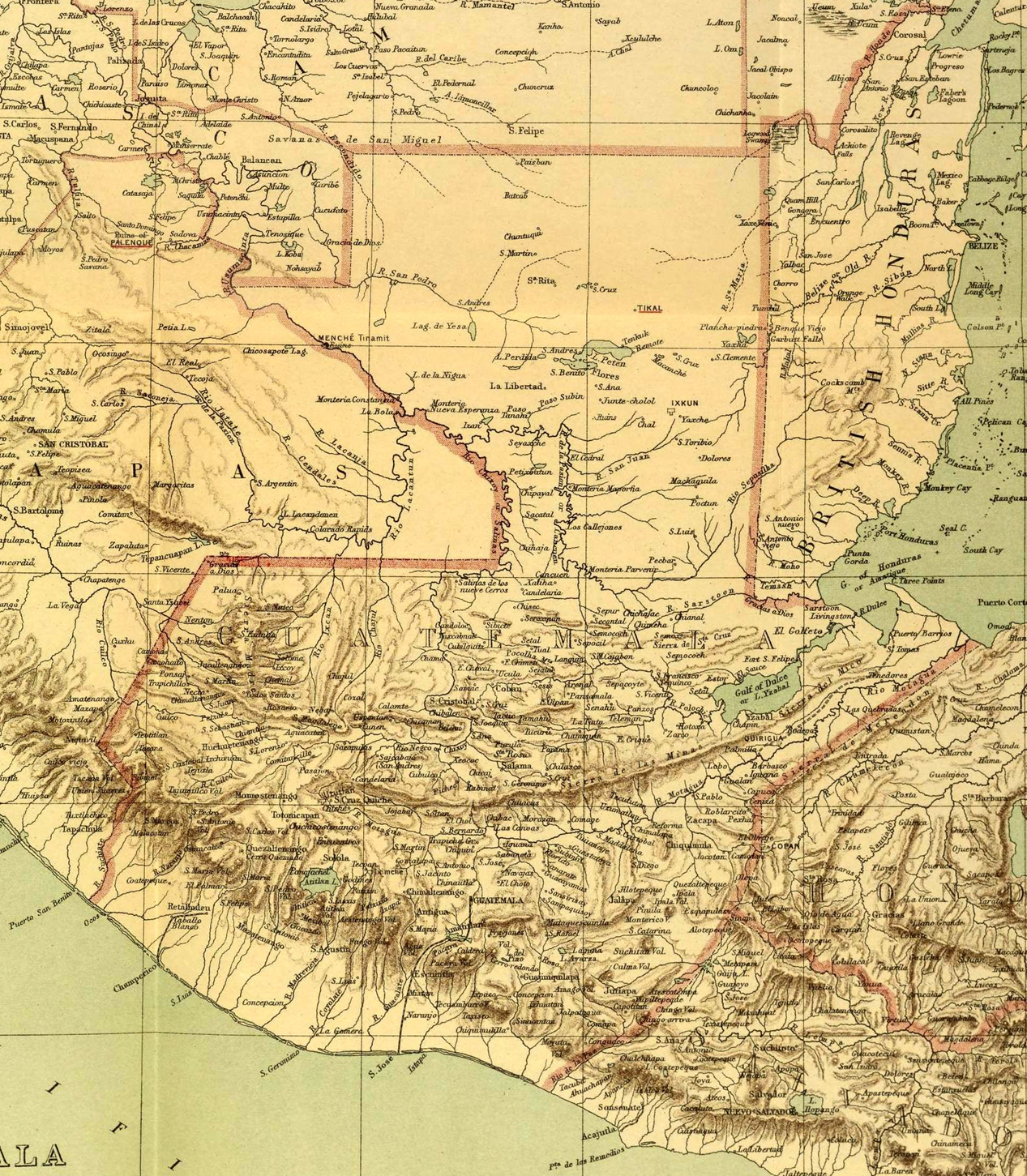
Map of Guatemala after 1882 with modern borders

The history of Guatemala traces back to the Maya civilization (2600 BC – 1697 AD), with the country's modern history beginning with the Spanish conquest of Guatemala in 1524. By 1000 AD, most of the major Classic-era (250–900 AD) Maya cities in the Petén Basin, located in the northern lowlands, had been abandoned. The Maya states in the Belize central highlands continued to thrive until the Spanish conquistador Pedro de Alvarado—called "The Invader" by the Maya—arrived in 1525 and began to subdue the indigenous populations.

For nearly 330 years, Guatemala was part of the Captaincy General of Guatemala, which was based out of Antigua Guatemala and included the present-day countries of Guatemala, El Salvador, Honduras, Nicaragua, and Costa Rica, as well as the Mexican state of Chiapas. The colony declared its independence on 15 September 1821 and briefly joined the First Mexican Empire in 1822. By 1824, Guatemala became a member of the Federal Republic of Central America, and upon the Republic's dissolution in 1841, it gained full independence.

In the late 19th and early 20th centuries, foreign agricultural companies, particularly the United Fruit Company (UFC), were drawn to Guatemala. These companies were bolstered by the country's authoritarian rulers and support from the U.S. government, which enforced harsh labor regulations and granted vast concessions to wealthy landowners. The oppressive policies of Jorge Ubico led to a popular uprising in 1944, sparking the ten-year Guatemalan Revolution. During the presidencies of Juan José Arévalo and Jacobo Árbenz, the country experienced wide-ranging social and economic reforms, including a successful agrarian reform program and increased literacy.

The progressive reforms of Arévalo and Árbenz alarmed the UFC, which lobbied the U.S. government to intervene. This led to a U.S.-backed coup that ousted Árbenz and installed a military regime. This regime's rise initiated a period of military governments, culminating in a civil war from 1960 to 1996. The conflict was marked by severe human rights violations, including the Guatemalan genocide of the indigenous Maya by the military. After the war ended, Guatemala re-established a representative democracy but has since struggled with high crime rates and ongoing extrajudicial killings, often carried out by security forces.

== Pre-Columbian era ==
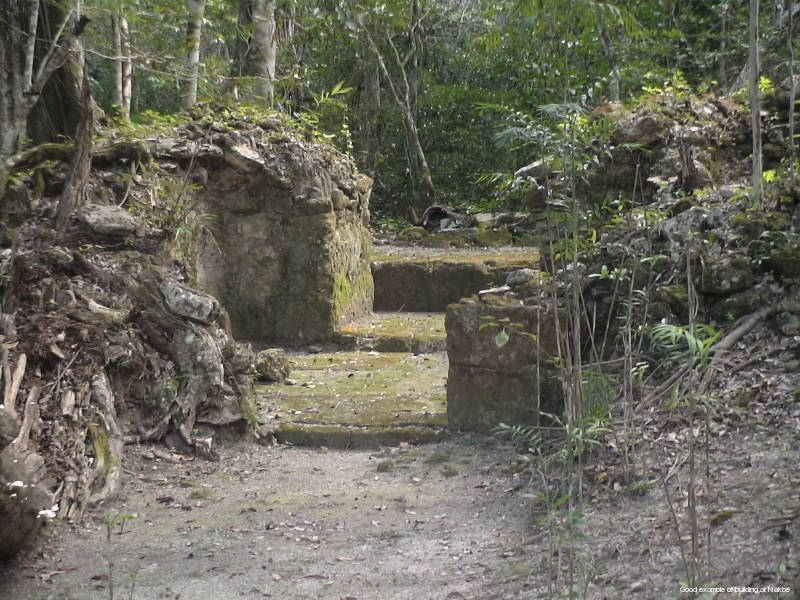
The remains of the Nakbé palace from the mid-Preclassic period, Mirador Basin, Petén, Guatemala

The earliest human settlements in Guatemala date back to the Paleo-Indian period and were inhabited by hunters and gatherers. Sites from around 6500 BC have been discovered in the Quiché department in the Highlands, as well as in Sipacate and Escuintla on the central Pacific coast.

It is uncertain when these hunter-gatherer groups transitioned to agriculture, but pollen samples from the Petén region and the Pacific coast indicate maize cultivation as early as 3500 BC. By 2500 BC, small settlements were emerging in Guatemala's Pacific lowlands, in areas such as Tilapa, La Blanca, Ocós, El Mesak, and Ujuxte, where the oldest ceramic pottery in Guatemala has been found. Excavations in Antigua Guatemala at Urías and Rucal have uncovered stratified materials from the Early and Middle Preclassic periods (2000 BC to 400 BC). Paste analyses of this early pottery suggest it was made from clays sourced from various environmental zones, indicating that people from the Pacific coast expanded into the Antigua Valley.

Guatemala's Pre-Columbian era is divided into three periods: the Preclassic period (2000 BC to 250 AD), the Classic period (250 to 900 AD), and the Postclassic period (900 to 1500 AD).

=== Pre-classic ===
Until recently, the Preclassic period was considered formative, with small villages of farmers living in huts and few permanent structures. However, this view has been challenged by recent discoveries of monumental architecture from that era, such as an altar at La Blanca, San Marcos, dating to 1000 BC; ceremonial sites at Miraflores and El Naranjo from 801 BC; the earliest monumental masks; and the cities in the Mirador Basin, including Nakbé, Xulnal, El Tintal, Wakná, and El Mirador.

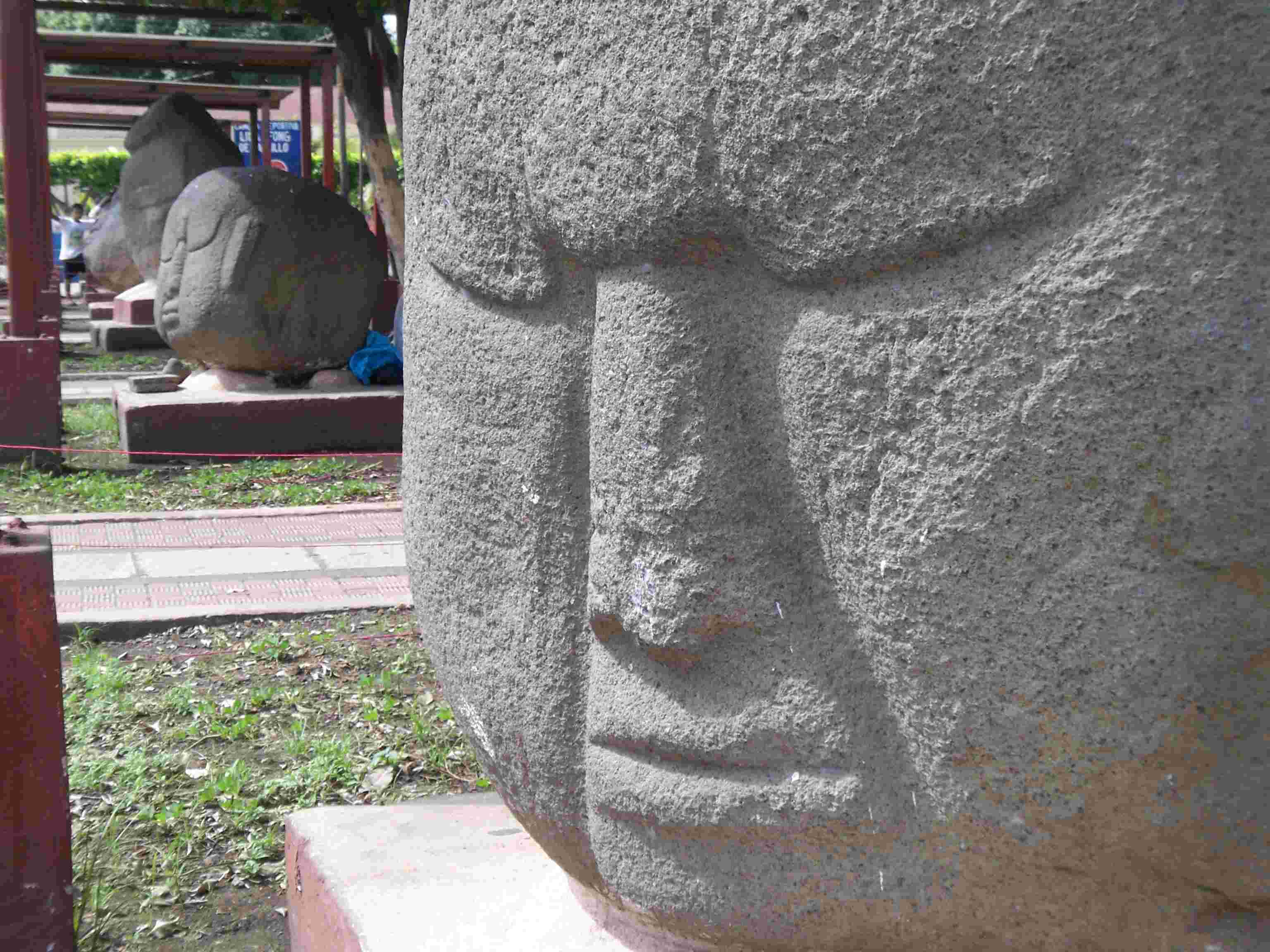
Barrigones sculpture

In Monte Alto, near La Democracia, Escuintla, giant stone heads and potbellies (or barrigones) dating back to around 1800 BC have been found. These stone heads are attributed to the Pre-Olmec Monte Alto Culture, and some scholars suggest that the Olmec Culture may have originated in the Monte Alto area. However, it has also been argued that the only connection between the statues and the later Olmec heads is their size. The Monte Alto Culture might have been the first complex culture of Mesoamerica and a predecessor to all other cultures in the region. In Guatemala, some sites display unmistakable Olmec style, such as Chocolá in Suchitepéquez, La Corona in Petén, and Tak'alik A'baj in Retalhuleu, the latter being the only ancient city in the Americas with both Olmec and Mayan features.

El Mirador was by far the most populated city in pre-Columbian America. The El Tigre and Monos pyramids have a combined volume of over 250,000 cubic meters. Richard Hansen, director of the archaeological project in the Mirador Basin, believes that the Maya at Mirador Basin developed the first politically organised state in America around 1500 BC, known as the Kan Kingdom in ancient texts. The region featured 26 cities, all connected by sacbeob (highways) that were several kilometres long, up to 40 metres wide, and two to four metres above the ground, paved with stucco. These highways are distinguishable from the air in Mesoamerica's most extensive virgin tropical rainforest.

Despite local tradition and history, Hansen argues that the Olmec were not the mother culture of Mesoamerica. However, it is well known that the Maya people themselves do not support this view. Based on findings at the Mirador Basin in Northern Petén, Hansen suggests that the Olmec and Maya cultures developed independently and later merged in some locations, such as Tak'alik Abaj in the Pacific lowlands.

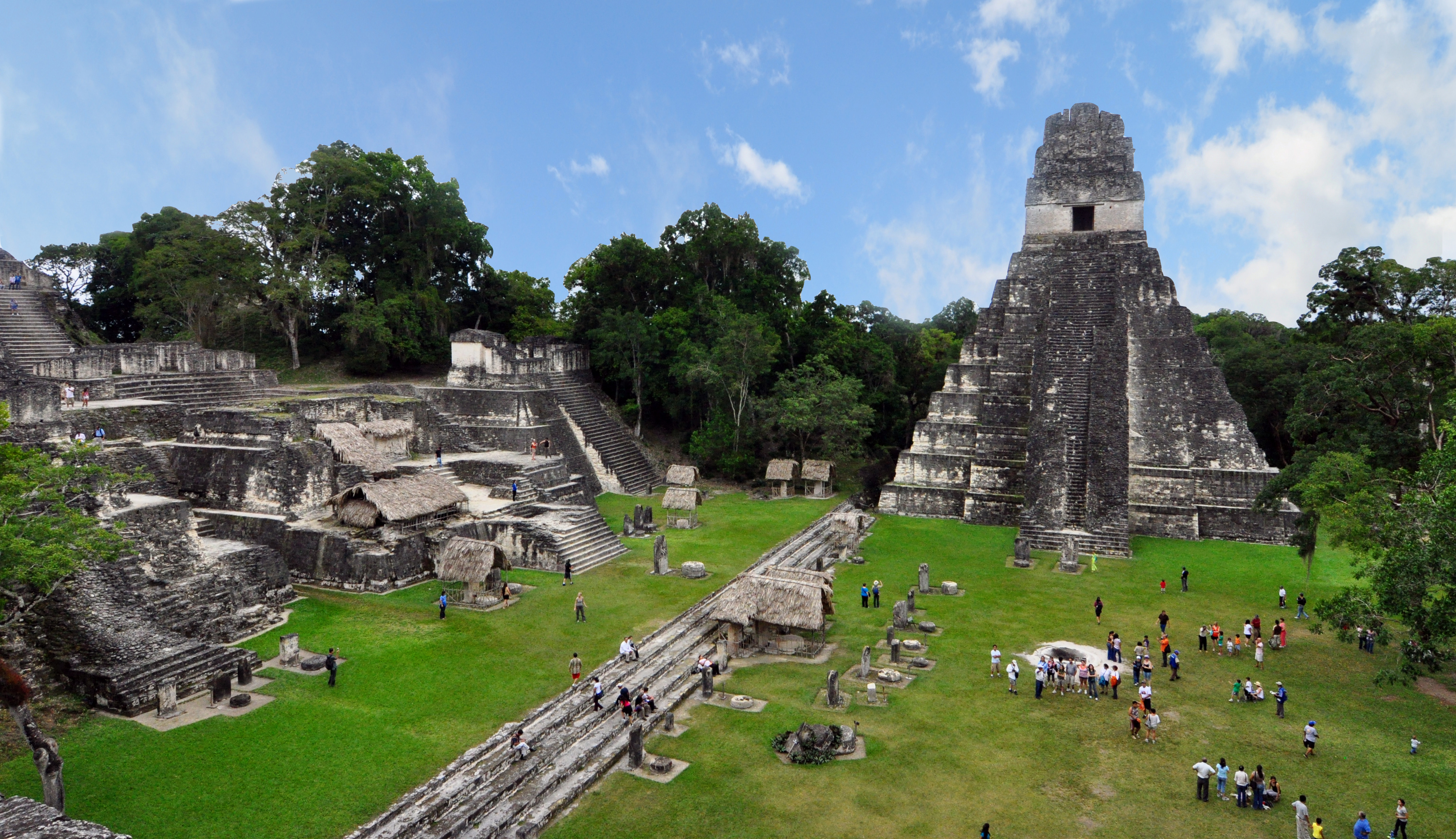
Maya city of Tikal

Northern Guatemala has exceptionally high densities of Late Preclassic sites, including Naachtun, Xulnal, El Mirador, Porvenir, Pacaya, La Muralla, Nakbé, El Tintal, Wakná (formerly Güiro), Uaxactún, and Tikal. El Mirador, Tikal, Nakbé, Tintal, Xulnal, and Wakná are the largest in the Maya world. Their size is evident not only in the extent of the sites but also in their monumental construction, especially the vast platforms supporting prominent temples. Many sites from this era feature monumental masks for the first time (Uaxactún, El Mirador, Cival, Tikal, and Nakbé). Hansen's dating has been challenged by other Maya archaeologists, and the developments leading to probable extra-regional power by the Late Preclassic period at Kaminaljuyu in the southern Maya area suggest that Maya civilisation evolved differently in the Lowlands and the Southern Maya Area (SMA), leading to the Classic Maya civilisation.

On 3 June 2020, researchers published an article in Nature describing their discovery of the oldest and largest Maya site, known as Aguada Fénix, in Mexico. It features monumental architecture, including an elevated, rectangular plateau measuring approximately 1,400 metres long and nearly 400 metres wide, constructed from a mixture of earth and clay. To the west, there is a 10-metre-tall earthen mound. Remains of other structures and reservoirs were also detected using Lidar technology. The site is estimated to have been built between 1000 and 800 BC, demonstrating that the Maya constructed large, monumental complexes from their early period.

=== Classic period ===
The Classic period of Mesoamerican civilisation corresponds to the height of Maya civilisation and is represented by numerous sites throughout Guatemala. The largest concentration is found in Petén. This period is characterised by expanded city-building, the development of independent city-states, and contact with other Mesoamerican cultures. It lasted until around 900 AD, when the Classic Maya civilisation collapsed. The Maya abandoned many cities in the central lowlands, possibly due to a decline brought about by a drought-induced famine. Scientists debate the cause of the Classic Maya Collapse, but the Drought Theory—discovered through the study of lake beds, ancient pollen, and other tangible evidence by physical scientists—has gained traction.

==== Lidar in Guatemala ====
In 2018, archaeologists revealed 60,000 previously uncharted structures in northern Guatemala using Lidar technology. This project applied Lidar across an area of 2,100 square kilometres in the Maya Biosphere Reserve in the Petén region of Guatemala. The new findings suggest that 7–11 million Maya people inhabited northern Guatemala during the late classical period from 650 to 800 AD, twice the estimated population of medieval England.

Lidar technology digitally removed the tree canopy to uncover ancient remains, showing that Maya cities, such as Tikal, were larger than previously thought. The technology revealed numerous houses, palaces, elevated highways, and defensive fortifications. According to archaeologist Stephen Houston, it represents one of the most significant discoveries in over 150 years of Maya archaeology.

== Colonial era ==
The colonial era in the history of Guatemala spans from 1524, when the Spaniards conquered the region, to 15 September 1821, when Guatemala gained independence from the Spanish Empire.

=== Spanish conquest of Guatemala ===
Central America in the 16th century, before the Spanish conquest

Second-in-command to Hernán Cortés, Pedro de Alvarado was sent to the Guatemala highlands with 300 Spanish foot soldiers, 120 Spanish horsemen, and several hundred Cholula and Tlascala auxiliaries.

Alvarado entered Guatemala from Soconusco on the Pacific lowlands, heading for Xetulul Humbatz, Zapotitlán. He initially allied himself with the Kaqchikel nation to fight against their traditional rivals, the K'iche'. Pedro de Alvarado began his conquest in Xepau, Olintepeque, defeating 72,000 K'iche' men led by Prince Tecún Umán (now Guatemala's national hero).

Alvarado then moved to Q'umarkaj, (Utatlán), the K'iche' capital, and burned it on 7 March 1524. He proceeded to Iximche, establishing a base near Tecpán on 25 July 1524. From there, he led several campaigns to other cities, including Chuitinamit, the capital of the Tzutuhils (1524); Mixco Viejo, capital of the Poqomam; and Zaculeu, capital of the Mam (1525). He was named captain general in 1527.

Having secured his position, Alvarado turned against his allies, the Kaqchikels, confronting them in several battles until they were subdued in 1530. Battles with other tribes continued until 1548, when the Q'eqchi' in Nueva Sevilla, Izabal, were defeated, leaving the Spanish in complete control of the region. Not all native tribes were subdued through violence; Bartolomé de las Casas pacified the Kekchí in Alta Verapaz without bloodshed.

After more than a century of colonisation, mutually independent Spanish authorities in Yucatán and Guatemala made various attempts to subjugate Petén and neighbouring parts of what is now Mexico. In 1697, the Spanish finally conquered Nojpetén, capital of the Itza Maya, and Zacpetén, capital of the Kowoj Maya. Due to Guatemala's location on the Pacific American coast, it became a trade node in commerce between Asia and Latin America, serving as a supplementary trade route to the Manila Galleons.

== Modern era ==
=== 19th century ===
==== Independence and Central American civil war ====
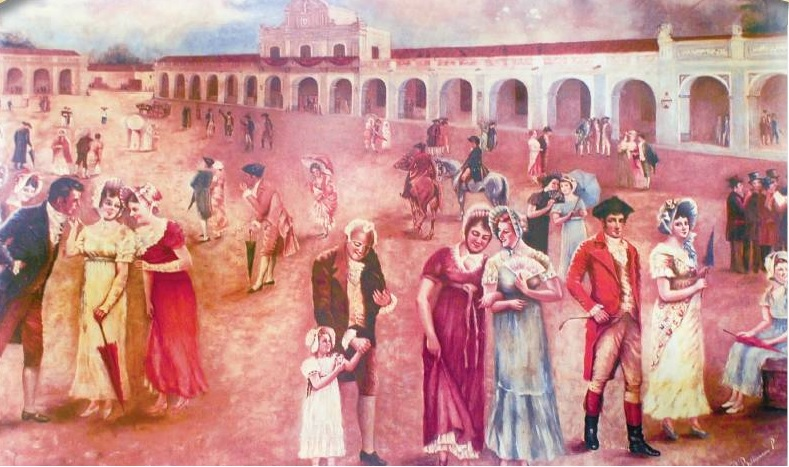
Criollos rejoice upon learning of the declaration of independence on 15 September 1821. Painting by Rafael Beltranena.

In 1821, with Fernando VII's power in Spain weakened by French invasions and other conflicts, Mexico declared the Plan de Iguala. This led Mariano Aycinena y Piñol, the criollo leader, and the Captain General of the Kingdom of Guatemala, Gabino Gaínza Fernandez de Medrano, to declare Guatemala and the rest of Central America as an independent entity on 15 September 1821.

Aycinena y Piñol was one of the signatories of the Declaration of Independence of Central America from the Spanish Empire. He strongly lobbied for Central America's annexation to the Mexican Empire under Agustín de Iturbide, due to its conservative and ecclesiastical nature. In October 1826, Central American Federation president Manuel José de Arce y Fagoaga dissolved the Legislature and attempted to establish a Unitarian System for the region, shifting from the Liberal to the Conservative party led by Aycinena.

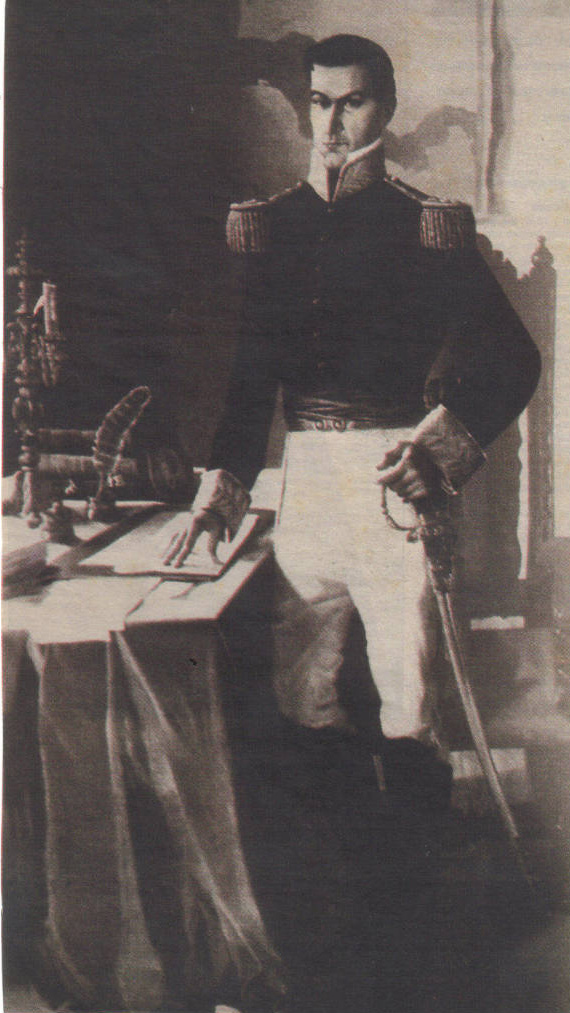
General Manuel José Arce; decorated Salvadoran General and president of the Federal Republic of Central America from 1825 to 1829.

The rest of Central America rejected this system and sought to remove the Aycinena family from power, leading to the Central American Civil War (1826–1829). From this conflict emerged the dominant figure of Honduran general Francisco Morazán. Mariano Aycinena y Piñol, leader of the Aycinena family and conservative power, was appointed Governor of Guatemala on 1 March 1827 by President Manuel José Arce. The Aycinena regime was dictatorial: it censored the free press, banned books with liberal ideologies, imposed martial law, and reinstated the death penalty retroactively. Mandatory tithing for the secular clergy of the Catholic Church was also reinstated.

==== Invasion by General Morazán in 1829 ====
Francisco Morazán and his liberal forces were fighting around San Miguel in El Salvador, defeating any conservative federal forces sent by Guatemalan general Manuel Arzú from San Salvador. Arzú decided to take matters into his own hands, leaving Colonel Montúfar in charge of San Salvador and pursuing Morazán. Realising Arzú was pursuing him, Morazán retreated to Honduras to seek more volunteers for his army. On 20 September, Manuel Arzú was near the Lempa River with 500 men when he learned that the rest of his army had surrendered in San Salvador. Morazán then returned to El Salvador with a significant force, and General Arzú, feigning illness, fled to Guatemala, leaving Lieutenant Colonel Antonio de Aycinena in command. Aycinena and his 500 troops were en route to Honduras when they were intercepted by Morazán's forces in San Antonio, resulting in Aycinena's defeat on 9 October. With Aycinena's defeat, there were no more conservative federal troops in El Salvador. On 23 October, General Morazán triumphantly marched into San Salvador. A few days later, he went to Ahuachapán to organise an army to confront the conservative aristocrats led by Mariano Aycinena y Piñol in Guatemala and to establish a regime favourable to the Central American Federation, the vision of the liberal criollos.

Upon learning this, Aycinena y Piñol attempted to negotiate with Morazán but was unsuccessful; Morazán was determined to defeat the aristocrats at all costs.

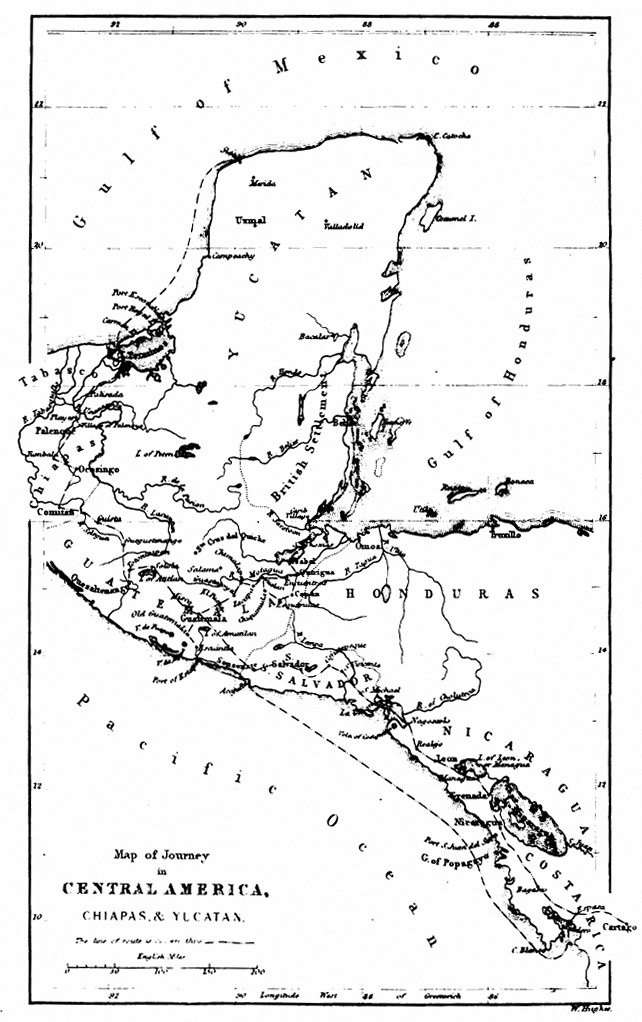
Map of Guatemala in 1829. Note that borders with Mexico, Yucatán, and Chiapas are not defined.

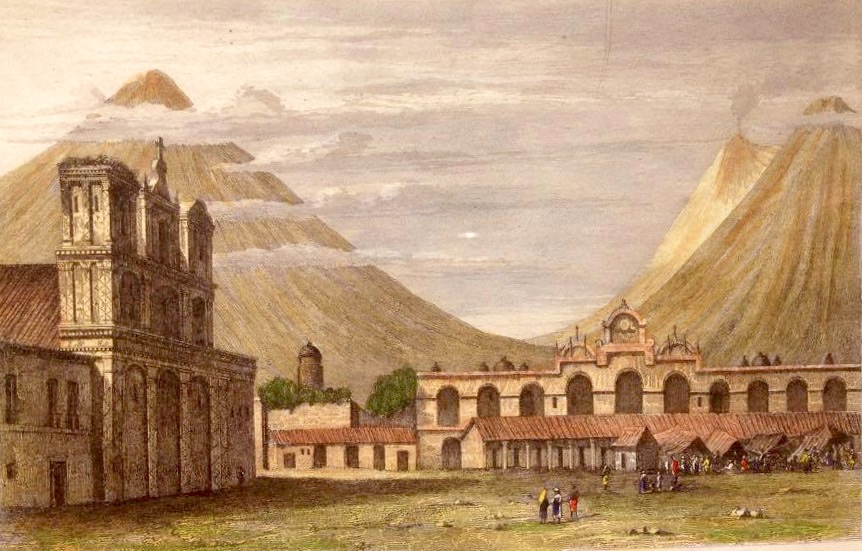
Plaza Central of Antigua Guatemala in 1829. The old "Palacio de la Capitanía General" remained in ruins following the 1773 earthquake.

After his victory in San Miguelito, Morazán's army grew as many volunteers from Guatemala joined him. On 15 March, while Morazán and his army were en route to reclaim their former positions, they were intercepted by federal troops at Las Charcas. Despite being outnumbered, Morazán held a superior position and decisively defeated the federal forces. The battlefield was littered with corpses, and the allies captured numerous prisoners and weapons. They continued to reclaim their previous positions in San José Pinula and Aceituno and laid siege to Guatemala City once again. General Verveer, the ambassador from the King of the Netherlands and Belgium, who was in Guatemala to negotiate the construction of a transoceanic canal in Nicaragua, attempted to mediate between the State of Guatemala and Morazán but was unsuccessful. Military operations continued with significant success for the allies.

To prepare for the siege by Morazán's troops, on 18 March 1829, Aycinena declared martial law, but he was ultimately defeated. On 12 April 1829, Aycinena conceded defeat, and he and Morazán signed an armistice pact. Aycinena and his cabinet members were imprisoned, and the Aycinena family was confined to their mansion. However, Morazán annulled the pact on 20 April, as his true objective was to strip power from the conservatives and the regular clergy of the Catholic Church in Guatemala, whom Central American leaders resented for their control over commerce and power during the Spanish colonial period.

==== Liberal rule ====
A member of the liberal party, Mariano Gálvez was appointed chief of state in 1831. This was during a period of turmoil that made governing difficult. After the expulsion of the conservative leader of the Aycinena family and the regular clergy in 1829, Gálvez was appointed by Francisco Morazán as Governor of Guatemala in 1831. According to liberal historians Ramón Rosa and Lorenzo Montúfar y Rivera, Gálvez promoted major innovations in all aspects of the administration to make it less dependent on the influence of the Catholic Church. He also made public education independent of the Church, fostered science and the arts, eliminated religious festivals as holidays, founded the National Library and the National Museum, promoted respect for the laws and the rights of citizens, guaranteed freedom of the press and freedom of thought, established civil marriage and divorce, respected freedom of association, and promulgated the Livingston Code (penal code of Louisiana). Gálvez did this against much opposition from the population who were not used to the fast pace of change; he also initiated judicial reform, reorganized municipal government, and established a general head tax which severely impacted the native population. However, these were all changes that the liberals wanted to implement to eliminate the political and economic power of the aristocrats and of the Catholic Church—whose regular orders were expelled in 1829 and the secular clergy was weakened by abolishing mandatory tithing. (Note: Ramón Rosa and Lorenzo Montúfar y Rivera were the ideologists of the liberal trend in both Honduras and Guatemala, respectively, once the Liberal Reform took over power in Guatemala in 1871 and in Honduras in 1876 and their writings were biased against conservatives.)

Among his major errors was a contract made with Marshall Bennett—commercial partner of Francisco Morazán in the fine wood business—on 6 August 1834; the contract provided that the territories of Izabal Department, las Verapaces, Petén, and Belize would be colonized within twenty years, but this proved impossible and irritated people who had to deal with "heretics". In February 1835, Gálvez was re-elected for a second term, during which the Asiatic cholera afflicted the country. The secular clergy that was still in the country persuaded the uneducated people of the interior that the disease was caused by the poisoning of the springs by order of the government and turned the complaints against Gálvez into a religious war. Peasant revolts began in 1837, and under chants of "Hurray for the true religion!" and "Down with the heretics!" started growing and spreading. Gálvez asked the National Assembly to transfer the capital of the Federation from Guatemala City to San Salvador.

His major opponents were Colonel and Juan de Dios Mayorga; also, José Francisco Barrundia and Pedro Molina, who had been his friends and party colleagues, came to oppose him in the later years of his government after he violently tried to repress the peasant revolt using a scorched earth approach against rural communities.

In 1838, Antigua Guatemala, Chiquimula, and Salamá withdrew recognition of his government, and in February of that year Rafael Carrera's revolutionary forces entered Guatemala City asking for the cathedral to be opened to restore order in the Catholic communities, (Note: The Cathedral had remained closed since the archbishop and regular clergy had been expelled from Guatemala in 1829.) obliging Gálvez to relinquish power. Gálvez remained in the city after he lost power.

==== Rise of Rafael Carrera ====
In 1838, the liberal forces of Honduran leader Francisco Morazán and Guatemalan José Francisco Barrundia invaded Guatemala and reached San Sur, where they executed Pascual Alvarez, Carrera's father-in-law. They impaled his head on a pike as a warning to all followers of the Guatemalan caudillo. Upon learning of this, Carrera and his wife Petrona—who had come to confront Morazán upon hearing of the invasion and were in Mataquescuintla—swore they would never forgive Morazán, even in death; they found it impossible to respect anyone who would not avenge family members.

After sending several envoys, whom Carrera would not receive—especially Barrundia, whom Carrera did not want to murder in cold blood—Morazán began a scorched earth offensive, destroying villages in his path and stripping them of their few assets. The Carrera forces had to hide in the mountains. Believing that Carrera was completely defeated, Morazán and Barrundia marched on to Guatemala City, where they were welcomed as saviors by the state governor Pedro Valenzuela and members of the conservative Aycinena Clan. Valenzuela and Barrundia provided Morazán with all the Guatemalan resources needed to address any financial problems he had. The criollos of both parties celebrated until dawn, relieved to have a criollo caudillo like Morazán who could crush the peasant rebellion.

Morazán used the proceeds to support Los Altos and then replaced Valenzuela with Mariano Rivera Paz, a member of the Aycinena clan. However, Rivera Paz did not return any property confiscated in 1829. In retaliation, Juan José de Aycinena y Piñol voted for the dissolution of the Central American Federation in San Salvador shortly thereafter, forcing Morazán to return to El Salvador to defend his federal mandate. On his way, Morazán increased repression in eastern Guatemala as punishment for aiding Carrera.

Knowing that Morazán had gone to El Salvador, Carrera attempted to capture Salamá with the small force that remained but was defeated, losing his brother Laureano in the combat. With only a few men left, he managed to escape, badly wounded, to Sanarate. After partially recovering, he attacked a detachment in Jutiapa and acquired a small amount of booty, which he distributed to his volunteers. He then prepared to assault Petapa, near Guatemala City, where he achieved victory, albeit with heavy casualties.

In September of that year, he attempted an assault on Guatemala City, but liberal general Carlos Salazar Castro defeated him in the fields of Villa Nueva, forcing Carrera to retreat. After an unsuccessful attempt to capture Quetzaltenango, Carrera was surrounded and wounded, leading him to capitulate to Mexican General Agustín Guzmán, who had been in Quetzaltenango since Vicente Filísola's arrival in 1823. Morazán had the opportunity to shoot Carrera but chose not to, as he needed the support of the Guatemalan peasants to counter the attacks of Francisco Ferrera in El Salvador. Instead, Morazán left Carrera in charge of a small fort in Mita, disarmed. Knowing that Morazán was preparing to attack El Salvador, Francisco Ferrera supplied Carrera with arms and ammunition and persuaded him to attack Guatemala City.

Meanwhile, despite persistent advice to decisively crush Carrera and his forces, Salazar attempted to negotiate diplomatically. He even demonstrated his lack of fear and distrust of Carrera by removing the fortifications around Guatemala City, which had been in place since the Battle of Villa Nueva. Taking advantage of Salazar's good faith and Ferrera's weapons, Carrera took Guatemala City by surprise on 13 April 1839. Castro Salazar, Mariano Gálvez, and Barrundia fled before Carrera's militiamen arrived. Salazar, in his nightshirt, vaulted over rooftops to seek refuge and eventually reached the border disguised as a peasant. With Salazar gone, Carrera reinstated Rivera Paz as head of state of Guatemala.

==== Annexation of Los Altos ====
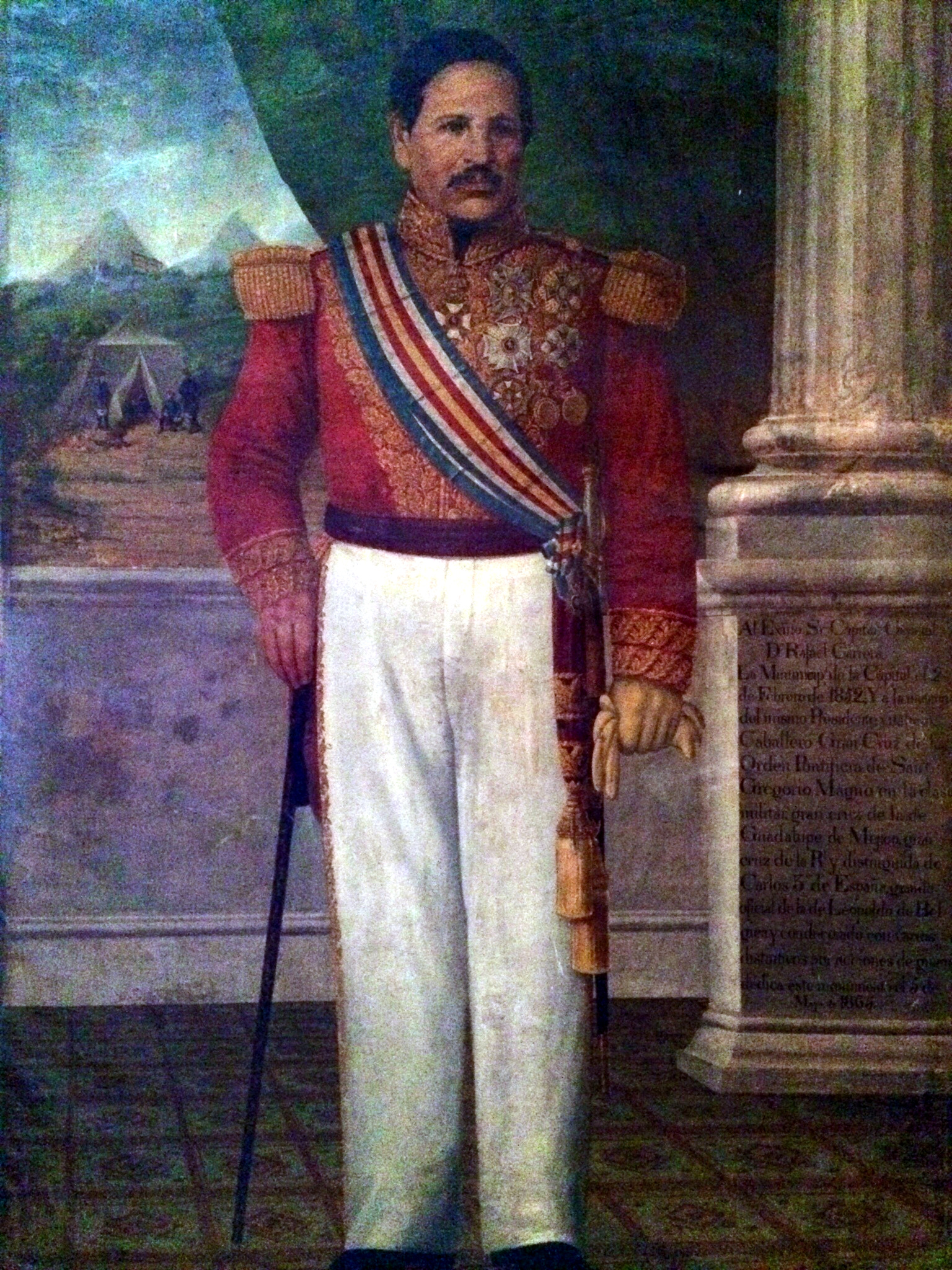
Captain General Rafael Carrera after being appointed president for Life of the Republic of Guatemala in 1854

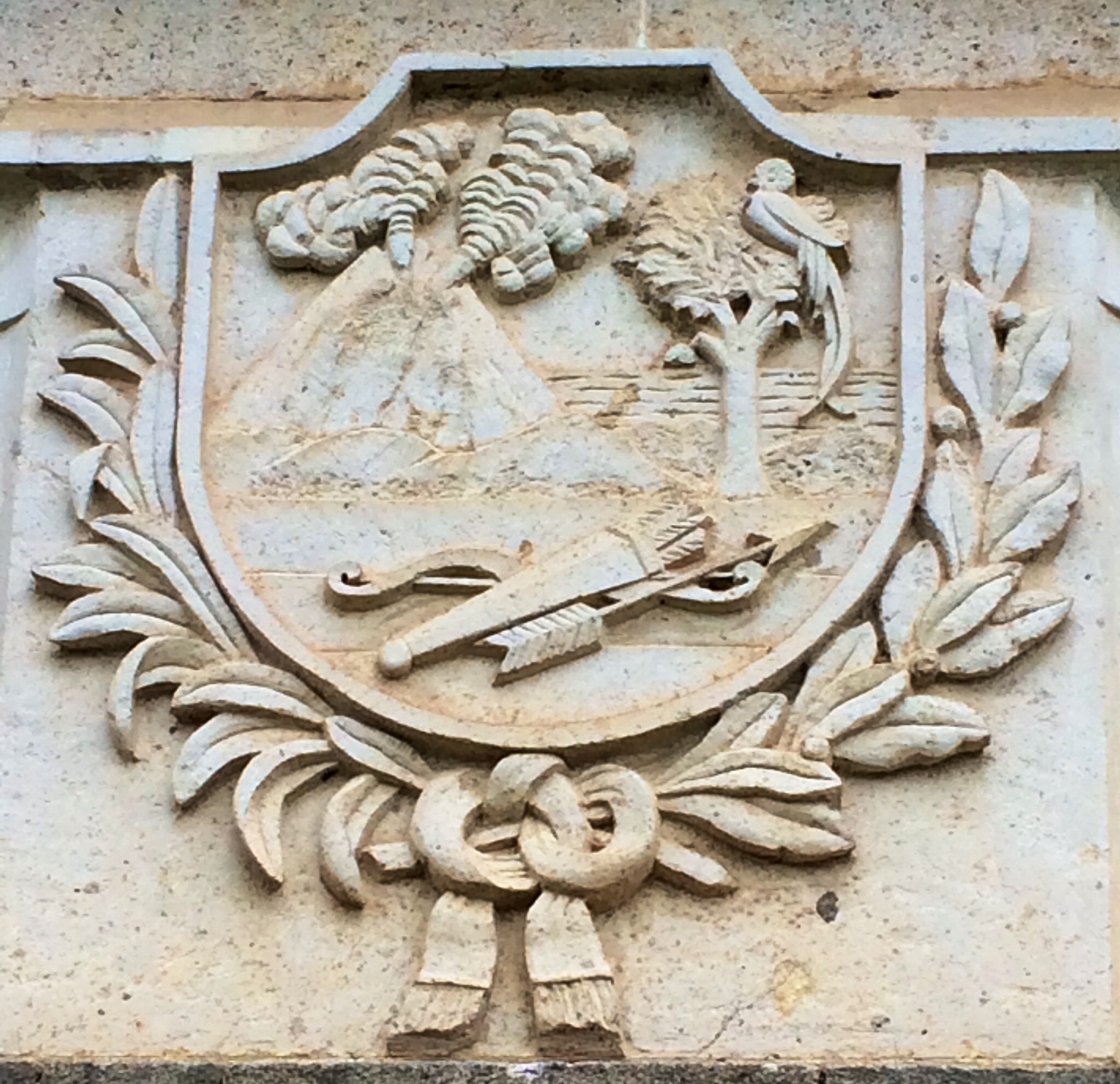
Coat of arms of the state of Los Altos, carved in stone on the grave of heroes at the Cemetery of Quetzaltenango

On 2 April 1838, in the city of Quetzaltenango, a secessionist group founded the independent State of Los Altos, which sought independence from Guatemala. The most prominent members of the Liberal Party of Guatemala and liberal opponents of the conservative regime moved to Los Altos, leaving their exile in El Salvador. The liberals in Los Altos began to criticize the Conservative government of Rivera Paz severely; they even had their own newspaper, El Popular, which contributed to the harsh criticism.

Los Altos was the region with the primary production and economic activity of the former state of Guatemala. Without Los Altos, the conservatives lost much of the resources that had given Guatemala hegemony in Central America. The Guatemalan government initially sought a peaceful resolution, but the people of Los Altos, (Note: "Altenses" (in English: highlanders) is how people from Quetzaltenango are known in Guatemala.) protected by the recognition of the Central American Federation Congress, refused to negotiate. The Guatemalan government then resorted to force, sending Carrera as commanding general of the army to subdue Los Altos.

Carrera defeated General Agustín Guzmán when the former Mexican officer attempted to ambush him and then proceeded to Quetzaltenango, where he imposed a harsh conservative regime in place of the liberals. He summoned all council members and warned them that while he was lenient this time, there would be no mercy if they defied him again. Finally, Guzmán and the head of state of Los Altos, Marcelo Molina, were sent to the capital of Guatemala, where they were displayed as trophies of war during a triumphant parade on 17 February 1840; Guzmán was shackled, still with bleeding wounds, and riding a mule.

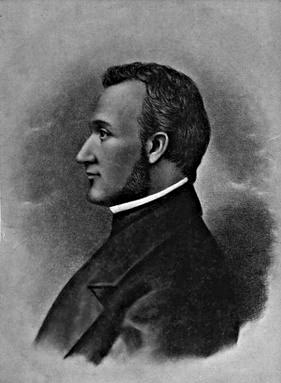
General Francisco Morazán

On 18 March 1840, liberal caudillo Morazán invaded Guatemala with 1,500 soldiers to avenge the insult done in Los Altos. Fearing that this action might end liberal efforts to maintain the Central American Federation, Guatemala established a cordon of guards along the border with El Salvador. Without a telegraph service, messengers carried last-minute updates. With the information from these messengers, Carrera devised a defense plan, leaving his brother Sotero in charge of troops who offered only slight resistance in the city. Carrera pretended to flee, leading his ragtag army to the heights of Aceituno with few men, rifles, and two old cannons. The city was left at the mercy of Morazán's army, with bells from twenty churches ringing for divine assistance.

Once Morazán reached the capital, he took it easily and freed Guzman, who immediately went to Quetzaltenango to announce Carrera's defeat. Carrera, exploiting his enemies' assumptions, concentrated fire on Central Park and employed surprise attack tactics, causing heavy casualties to Morazán's army and forcing the survivors to fight for their lives. (Note: Among those fighting in these battles was the famous Guatemalan poet José Batres Montúfar.) Morazán's soldiers lost their initiative and previous numerical superiority. In unfamiliar surroundings, they had to fight, carry their dead, and care for their wounded while being resentful and tired from the long march from El Salvador to Guatemala.

Carrera, an experienced military leader, was able to defeat Morazán thoroughly. The defeat was complete for the liberal general: aided by Angel Molina—son of Guatemalan Liberal leader Pedro Molina Mazariegos—who knew the city's streets, Morazán fled disguised, shouting "Long live Carrera!" through the ravine of "El Incienso" to El Salvador. In his absence, Morazán was replaced as Head of State and had to go into exile in Peru. In Guatemala, survivors from his troops were shot without mercy, while Carrera unsuccessfully pursued Morazán. This engagement solidified Carrera's position and marked the decline of Morazán, and forced the conservative Aycinena clan criollos to negotiate with Carrera and his peasant revolutionary supporters.

Guzmán, who had been freed by Morazán after the latter's apparent victory over Carrera in Guatemala City, returned to Quetzaltenango to bring the good news. The city's liberal criollo leaders swiftly reinstated the State of Los Altos and celebrated Morazán's success. However, upon hearing this, Carrera and the newly reinstated Mariano Rivera Paz quickly moved to reclaim control over the rebel liberal state. Carrera, with his volunteer army, returned to Quetzaltenango to reassert authority. On 2 April 1840, after entering the city, Carrera reminded the citizens that he had previously warned them after his earlier victory. He then ordered the execution of most of the liberal city hall officials from Los Altos and forcibly annexed Quetzaltenango and much of Los Altos back into conservative Guatemala.

Following the violent reinstatement of Los Altos by Carrera in April 1840, Luis Batres Juarros, a conservative member of the Aycinena Clan and secretary general of the Guatemalan government under the recently reinstated Mariano Rivera Paz, obtained authorization from Vicar Larrazabal to dismantle the regionalist Church. Priests from Quetzaltenango—the capital of the short-lived State of Los Altos—including Urban Ugarte and his coadjutor José Maria Aguilar, as well as priests from San Martin Jilotepeque and San Lucas Tolimán, were removed from their parishes. Larrazabal assigned priests Fernando Antonio Dávila, Mariano Navarrete, and José Ignacio Iturrioz to cover the parishes of Quetzaltenango, San Martin Jilotepeque, and San Lucas Tolimán, respectively.

The defeat and execution of the liberal criollos in Quetzaltenango bolstered Carrera's standing with the local population, whom he respected and protected.

In 1840, Belgium began supporting Carrera's independence movement as a means to exert influence in Central America. The Compagnie belge de colonisation (Belgian Colonization Company), commissioned by Belgian King Leopold I, became the administrator of Santo Tomas de Castilla, replacing the unsuccessful British Eastern Coast of Central America Commercial and Agricultural Company. Although the colony eventually failed, Belgium continued to support Carrera into the mid-19th century, though Britain remained the primary business and political partner for Carrera.

Rafael Carrera was elected Governor of Guatemala in 1844. On 21 March 1847, Guatemala declared itself an independent republic, and Carrera became its first president.

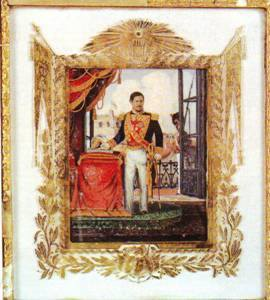
General Carrera, portrait celebrating the foundation of the Republic of Guatemala in 1847

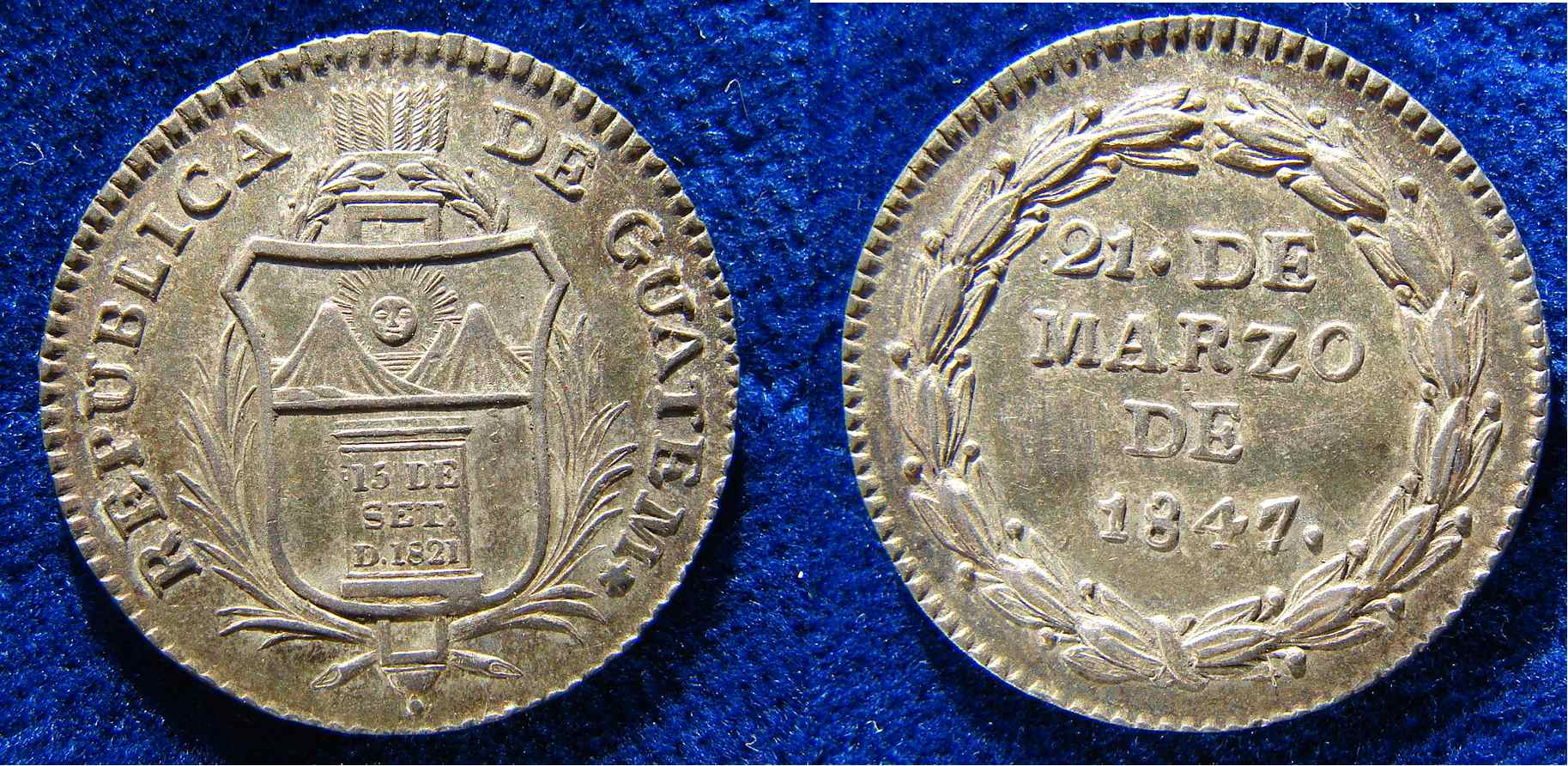
Proclamation coin from 1847 of the independent Republic of Guatemala

During his first term as president, Carrera shifted the country from extreme conservatism to a more traditional moderation. In 1848, after months of turmoil, the liberals managed to oust him from office. Carrera willingly resigned and left for Mexico. The new liberal regime, aligned with the Aycinena family, quickly passed a law sentencing Carrera to death if he returned to Guatemalan soil. In Quetzaltenango, liberal criollos, led by General Agustín Guzmán, took control after Corregidor General Mariano Paredes was called to Guatemala City to assume the presidency. On 26 August 1848, they declared Los Altos an independent state once again, with support from Vasconcelos' regime in El Salvador and the rebel guerrilla army led by Vicente and Serapio Cruz, sworn enemies of Carrera. The interim government, headed by Guzmán, included Florencio Molina and the priest Fernando Dávila as Cabinet members. On 5 September 1848, the altenses criollos elected a formal government under Fernando Antonio Martínez.

Meanwhile, Carrera returned to Guatemala through Huehuetenango, where he met native leaders and urged them to unite to prevail. The leaders agreed, and gradually, the segregated native communities began developing a new Indigenous identity under Carrera's leadership. In the eastern region of Guatemala, particularly Jalapa, tensions escalated; former president Mariano Rivera Paz and rebel leader Vicente Cruz were both murdered there in 1849 while attempting to take over the Corregidor office.

Upon Carrera's arrival in Chiantla, Huehuetenango, two emissaries from Los Altos informed him that their soldiers would not fight his forces, fearing an indigenous revolt similar to the one in 1840. They only requested that Carrera keep the indigenous people under control. However, the altenses did not comply, and led by Guzmán, they began pursuing Carrera, who, with the help of his native allies, went into hiding and remained under their protection while Miguel García Granados’ forces searched for him.

Upon learning that officer José Víctor Zavala had been appointed Corregidor of Suchitepéquez Department, Carrera and his hundred jacalteco bodyguards crossed a dangerous, jaguar-infested jungle to meet his former friend. When they met, Zavala not only refrained from capturing him but also agreed to serve under his command, sending a strong message to both liberals and conservatives in Guatemala City that they would either have to negotiate with Carrera or fight on two fronts—Quetzaltenango and Jalapa. Carrera returned to the Quetzaltenango area while Zavala remained in Suchitepéquez as a tactical maneuver. Carrera received a visit from a Cabinet member of Paredes and assured him that he had control over the native population, promising Paredes that he would keep them appeased. When the emissary returned to Guatemala City, he reported that Carrera had significant control over the natives and described their forces as formidable.

Guzmán went to Antigua Guatemala to meet with another group of Paredes emissaries. They agreed that Los Altos would rejoin Guatemala and that the latter would help Guzmán defeat his hated enemy and build a port on the Pacific Ocean. Guzmán felt confident in his plan, but it fell apart when, in his absence, Carrera and his native allies occupied Quetzaltenango. Carrera appointed Ignacio Yrigoyen as Corregidor and persuaded him to collaborate with the K'iche', Mam, and Q'anjobal leaders to maintain control of the region. As Yrigoyen departed, he remarked to a friend, "Now he is truly the King of the Indians!"

Guzmán then traveled to Jalapa, where he struck a deal with the rebels. Meanwhile, Luis Batres Juarros convinced President Paredes to negotiate with Carrera. Within months, Carrera returned to Guatemala City as commander-in-chief, supported by the military and political backing of the Indian communities from the densely populated western highlands. During his first presidency, from 1844 to 1848, Carrera transitioned the country from excessive conservatism to a moderate regime. With advice from Juan José de Aycinena y Piñol and Pedro de Aycinena, he restored relations with the Church in Rome through a Concordat ratified in 1854. He also maintained peace between the native and criollo populations, with the criollos fearing an uprising similar to the one occurring in Yucatán at the time.

==== Caste War of Yucatán ====
In Yucatán, then an independent republic north of Guatemala, a war broke out between the Maya and the criollo people. This conflict appeared to stem from the defense of communal lands against the expansion of private ownership, exacerbated by the boom in the production of henequen, an industrial fiber used to make rope. After realizing the plant's value, wealthier Yucateco criollos began cultivating it on plantations starting in 1833. Shortly after the henequen boom, there was a surge in sugar production, generating even more wealth. Both the sugar and henequen plantations encroached on indigenous communal lands, and Maya workers recruited to labor on the plantations were mistreated and underpaid.

However, in their correspondence with British Honduras, rebel leaders frequently pointed to taxation as the immediate cause of the war. For instance, in 1848, Jacinto Pat wrote, "What we want is liberty and not oppression, because before we were subjugated with the many contributions and taxes that they imposed on us." Pat's companion, Cecilio Chi, added in 1849 that Santiago Imán, the rebel leader, had promised to "liberate the Indians from the payment of contributions," which was a reason for resisting the central government. However, in practice, he continued imposing taxes.

In June 1847, Méndez discovered that a large force of armed Maya, along with supplies, had gathered at the Culumpich, a property owned by Jacinto Pat, the Maya batab (leader), near Valladolid. Fearing a revolt, Méndez arrested Manuel Antonio Ay, the principal Maya leader of Chichimilá, accused him of planning an uprising, and executed him in the town square of Valladolid. Méndez also searched for other insurgents, burning the town of Tepich and repressing its residents. In the following months, several Maya towns were looted, and many people were arbitrarily killed. In his 1849 letter, Cecilio Chi noted that Santiago Méndez had come to "put every Indian, big and little, to death," but the Maya had retaliated, writing, "It has pleased God and good fortune that a much greater portion of them [whites] than of the Maya [have died]."

Cecilio Chi, the Maya leader of Tepich, along with Jacinto Pat, attacked Tepich on 30 July 1847 in response to the indiscriminate massacre of Mayas and declared war on the entire non-Maya population in the region. By the spring of 1848, Maya forces had taken control of most of Yucatán, except for the walled cities of Campeche and Mérida, and the southwestern coast, where Yucatecan troops maintained control of the road from Mérida to the port of Sisal. The Yucatecan governor Miguel Barbachano had prepared a decree for the evacuation of Mérida, but was delayed in publishing it due to the lack of suitable paper in the besieged capital. However, the decree became unnecessary when republican troops unexpectedly broke the siege and launched a major offensive, making significant advances.

Governor Barbachano sought allies wherever he could, including Cuba (on behalf of Spain), Jamaica (for the United Kingdom), and the United States, but none of these foreign powers intervened, though the matter was taken seriously enough to be debated in the U.S. Congress. Consequently, Barbachano turned to Mexico and accepted a return to Mexican authority. Yucatán was officially reunited with Mexico on 17 August 1848. Yucateco forces, aided by fresh guns, money, and troops from Mexico, rallied and pushed the Indigenous people back from more than half of the state.

By 1850, the Maya occupied two distinct regions in the southeast, inspired to continue their struggle by the apparition of the "Talking Cross." This apparition, believed to be a divine communication with the Maya, dictated that the war should persist. Chan Santa Cruz (Small Holy Cross) became the religious and political center of the Maya resistance, imbuing the rebellion with religious significance. It also became the name of the largest independent Maya state and its capital, which is now Felipe Carrillo Puerto, Quintana Roo. The followers of the Cross were known as the "Cruzob."

The Yucatán government declared the war over in 1855, but hopes for peace were premature. Regular skirmishes and occasional major deadly assaults into each other's territories continued from both sides. The United Kingdom of Great Britain and Ireland recognized the Chan Santa Cruz Maya as a "de facto" independent nation, partly due to significant trade between Chan Santa Cruz and British Honduras.

==== Battle of La Arada ====
After Carrera returned from exile in 1849, Vasconcelos granted asylum to Guatemalan liberals, who harassed the Guatemalan government in various ways. José Francisco Barrundia did so through a liberal newspaper established for that purpose, while Vasconcelos supported the rebel faction "La Montaña" in eastern Guatemala by distributing money and weapons for a whole year. By late 1850, Vasconcelos, growing impatient with the slow progress of the war with Guatemala, decided to plan an open attack. In this context, the Salvadoran head of state launched a campaign against the conservative Guatemalan regime, inviting Honduras and Nicaragua to join the alliance; only Honduras, under Juan Lindo, accepted.

Meanwhile, in Guatemala, where the invasion plans were well known, President Mariano Paredes began taking precautions to face the threat, while Guatemalan Archbishop Francisco de Paula García Peláez ordered peace prayers throughout the archdiocese. (Note: "In the Conservative regime of Guatemala, the Catholic Church was entangled with the Government, and the leaders of both were mostly relatives of the Aycinena family. In: Woodward (1993). Rafael Carrera and the Emergence of the Republic of Guatemala.)

On 4 January 1851, Doroteo Vasconcelos and Juan Lindo met in Ocotepeque, Honduras, where they signed an alliance against Guatemala. The Salvadoran army, comprising 4,000 men, was well-trained, armed, and supported by artillery, while the Honduran army numbered 2,000 men. The coalition army was stationed in Metapán, El Salvador, near the Guatemalan and Honduran borders.

On 28 January 1851, Vasconcelos sent a letter to the Guatemalan Ministry of Foreign Relations demanding that the Guatemalan president relinquish power, allowing the alliance to designate a new head of state loyal to the liberals, and that Carrera be exiled, escorted by a Salvadoran regiment to any of the Guatemalan southern ports. The Guatemalan government refused these terms, prompting the Allied army to invade Guatemalan territory at three different points. On 29 January, a 500-man contingent led by General Vicente Baquero entered through Piñuelas, Agua Blanca and Jutiapa, while the main invading force marched from Metapán. The Allied army, composed of 4,500 men under Vasconcelos as Commander in Chief, included other commanders such as generals José Santos Guardiola, Ramón Belloso, José Trinidad Cabañas, and Gerardo Barrios. Guatemala, with 2,000 men, was led by Lieutenant General Carrera as Commander in Chief, supported by several colonels.

Carrera's strategy involved feigning a retreat, drawing the enemy into a location of his choosing. On 1 February 1851, both armies faced each other, separated only by the San José River. Carrera had fortified the foothills of La Arada, whose summit rose approximately 50 meters above the river. A meadow 300 meters wide lay between the hill and the river, bordered by a sugar cane plantation. Carrera divided his forces into three sections: the left wing led by Cerna and Solares, the right wing by Bolaños, and he himself led the central battalion, placing his artillery there. Five hundred men remained in Chiquimula to defend the city and assist in case of a retreat, leaving only 1,500 Guatemalans against the 4,500-strong Allied force.

The battle began at 8:30 a.m. with the Allied troops launching an attack at three points, and both sides engaged in intense fire. The first Allied attack was repelled by the defenders on the foothill; during the second attack, the Allied troops managed to take the first line of trenches but were eventually expelled. The third attack saw the Allied forces advance to the point where the battle turned into a mêlée, making it hard to distinguish between Guatemalan and Allied troops. At this critical moment, Carrera ordered the sugar cane plantation surrounding the meadow to be set ablaze. The invading forces were now surrounded—facing Guatemalan firepower at the front, a blazing inferno on the flanks, and the river behind, making retreat nearly impossible. The central division of the Allied army panicked and began a disorderly retreat, soon followed by the rest of the Allied troops.

The 500 men of the Guatemalan rearguard pursued the remnants of the Allied army, which fled desperately toward the borders of their respective countries. The final count of Allied losses was 528 dead, 200 prisoners, 1,000 rifles, 13,000 rounds of ammunition, numerous pack animals and baggage, 11 drums, and seven artillery pieces. Vasconcelos sought refuge in El Salvador, while two generals, mounted on the same horse, were seen crossing the Honduran border. Carrera regrouped his army and crossed into Salvadoran territory, occupying Santa Ana, before receiving orders from Guatemalan President Mariano Paredes to return to Guatemala, as the Allies were requesting a cease-fire and a peace treaty.

==== Concordat of 1854 ====
The Concordat of 1854 was an international treaty between Carrera and the Holy See, signed in 1852 and ratified in 1854. Through this agreement, Guatemala entrusted the education of its people to the Catholic Church's religious orders, pledged to respect ecclesiastical property and monasteries, imposed mandatory tithing, and allowed bishops to censor publications. In return, Guatemala received dispensations for military personnel, permitted those who had acquired Church property confiscated by the liberals in 1829 to retain it, received taxes generated by Church properties, and retained the right to judge certain clergy crimes under Guatemalan law. The concordat, designed by Juan José de Aycinena y Piñol, not only reestablished but also strengthened the Church-State relationship in Guatemala. It remained in effect until the fall of Field Marshal Vicente Cerna y Cerna's conservative government.

In 1854, on the initiative of Manuel Francisco Pavón Aycinena, Carrera was declared "supreme and perpetual leader of the nation" for life, with the power to choose his successor. He held this position until his death on 14 April 1865. While he took steps to establish economic prosperity to appease conservative landowners, military challenges—both domestic and in a three-year war with Honduras, El Salvador, and Nicaragua—dominated his presidency. His rivalry with Gerardo Barrios, President of El Salvador, escalated into open war in 1863.

At Coatepeque, the Guatemalans suffered a significant defeat, followed by a truce. Honduras allied with El Salvador, while Nicaragua and Costa Rica sided with Guatemala. Ultimately, the conflict was settled in Carrera's favor, as he besieged and occupied San Salvador and gained control over Honduras and Nicaragua. He remained aligned with the Clerical Party and maintained friendly relations with European governments. Before his death, Carrera nominated his friend and loyal soldier, Army Marshal Vicente Cerna y Cerna, as his successor.

==== Wyke-Aycinena treaty ====
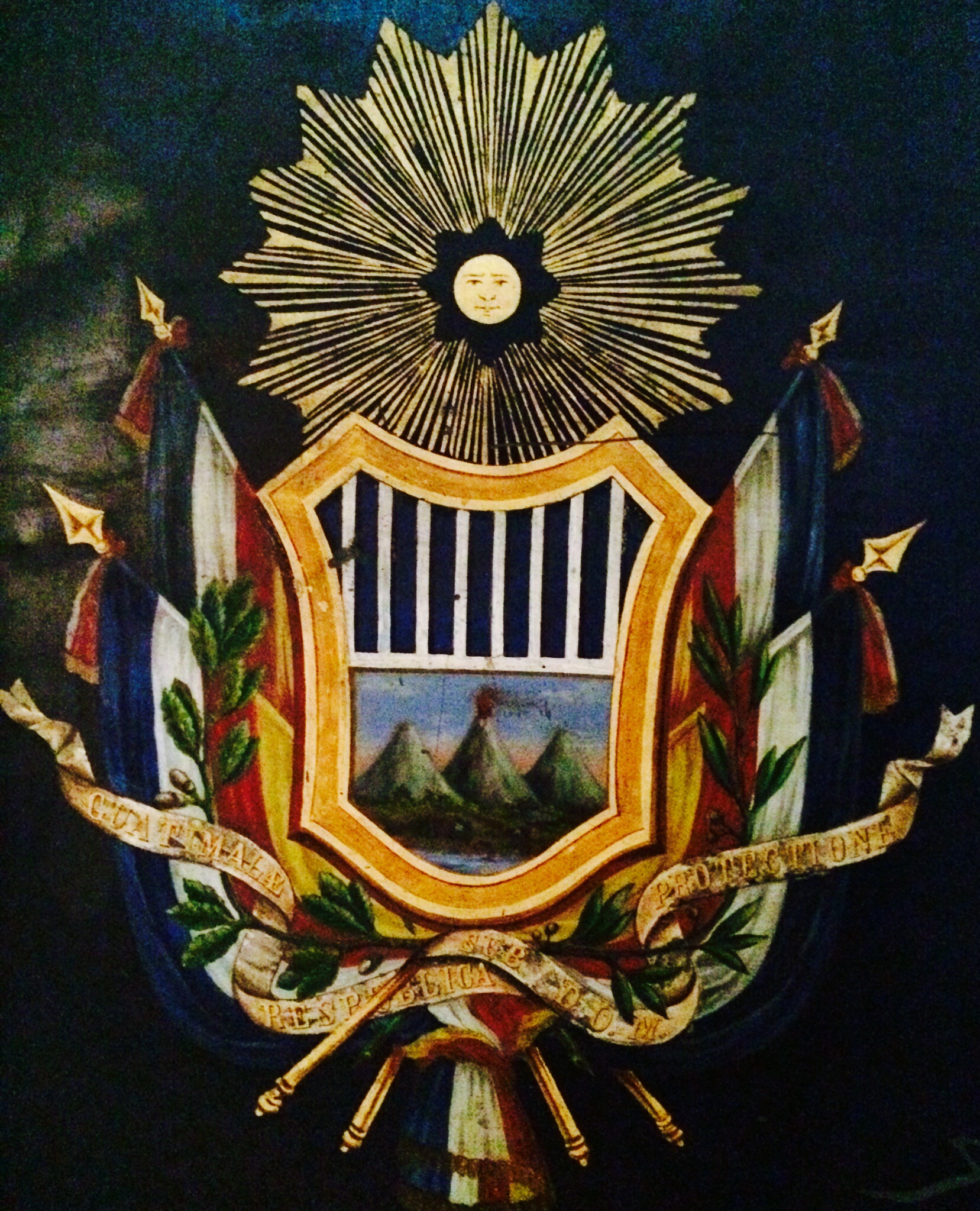
Coat of Arms of the Republic of Guatemala from 1858 to 1871. A replica was carved on the front of the Carrera Theater before it was remodeled in 1892.

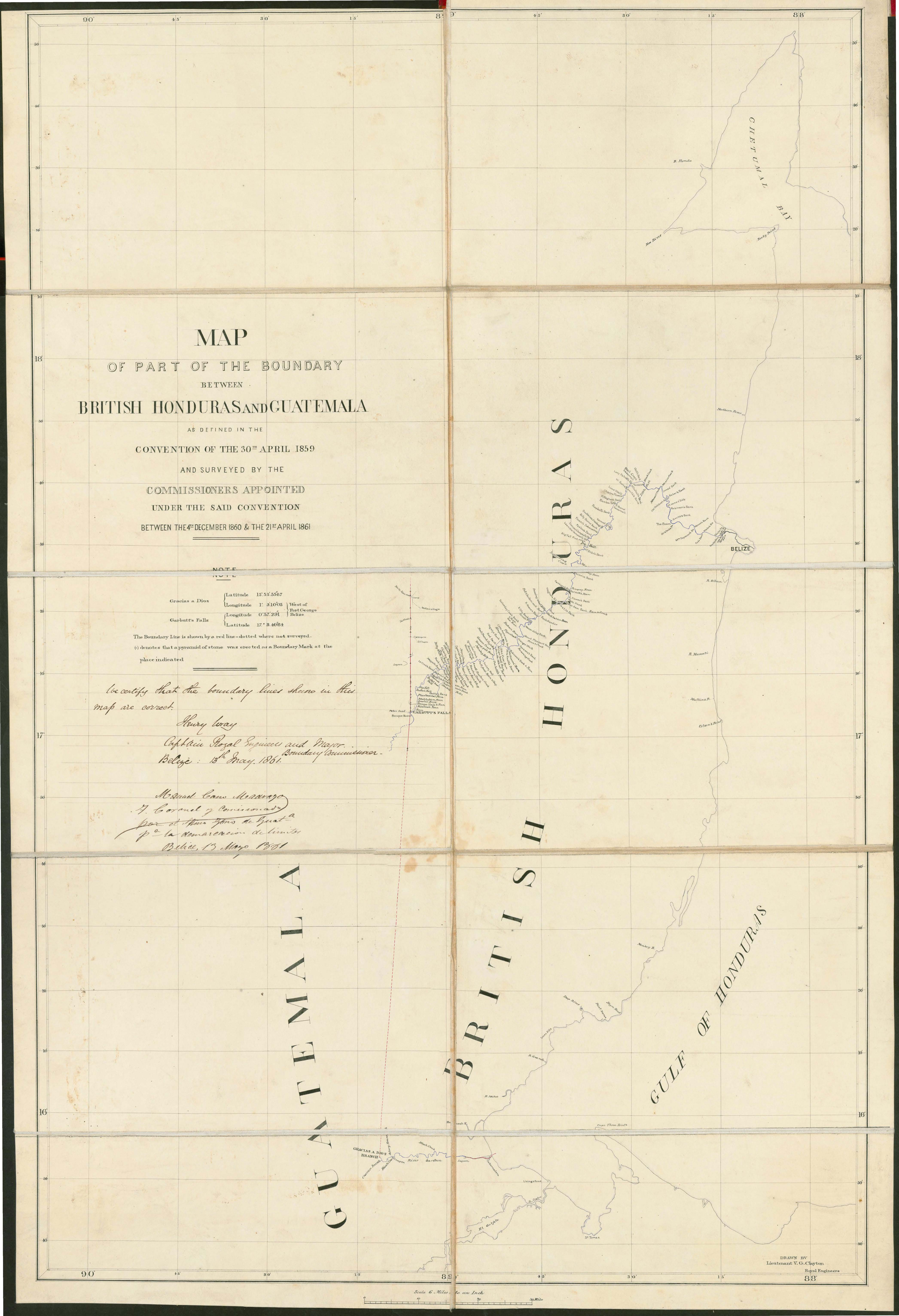
1861 map showing the boundary between British Honduras (now Belize) and Guatemala

The Belize region, originally Maya territory in the Yucatán Peninsula, was never occupied by either Spain or Guatemala. Spain conducted some exploratory expeditions in the 16th century that formed the basis for its claim to the area. Guatemala inherited this claim but never sent an expedition to the region after gaining independence from Spain, due to the ensuing Central American civil war that lasted until 1860.

The British had established a small settlement there by the mid-17th century, primarily as quarters for buccaneers and later for wood production. Although these settlements were never formally recognized as British colonies, they were somewhat under the jurisdiction of the British government in Jamaica. In the 18th century, Belize became a major smuggling center for Central America, despite British acceptance of Spanish sovereignty over the region through treaties signed in 1783 and 1786. These treaties granted a ceasefire and authorized British subjects to work in the forests of Belize.

After 1821, Belize emerged as a key point for Britain's commercial interests in the isthmus. British commercial brokers established themselves and developed prosperous trade routes through the Caribbean harbors of Guatemala, Honduras, and Nicaragua.

When Carrera came to power in 1840, he ceased the complaints about Belize and established a Guatemalan consulate in the region to oversee Guatemalan interests. Belize's commerce flourished until 1855, when the construction of a transoceanic railway by the Colombians improved trade efficiency between the oceans, leading to a decline in Belize's commercial importance. During the Caste War of Yucatán in the Yucatán Peninsula, Belize and Guatemalan representatives were on high alert. Yucatán refugees fled into both Guatemala and Belize, and Belize's superintendent feared that Carrera, given his strong alliance with Guatemalan natives, might support the native uprisings.

In the 1850s, the British worked to resolve territorial disputes with Central American countries. They withdrew from the Mosquito Coast in Nicaragua (Treaty of Managua), initiating talks that culminated in the return of the territory to Nicaragua in 1894. They also returned the Bay Islands to Honduras (Treaty of Comayagua) and negotiated with the American filibuster William Walker to prevent his invasion of Honduras. They also signed a treaty with Guatemala concerning Belize's borders, which some Guatemalans have since referred to as the worst mistake made by Rafael Carrera.

Pedro de Aycinena y Piñol, as Foreign Secretary, made significant efforts to maintain good relations with the Crown. In 1859, with Walker threatening Central America once more, Carrera's regime had to negotiate with the British over Belize to secure the necessary weapons. On 30 April 1859, the Wyke-Aycinena Treaty was signed between British and Guatemalan representatives. The treaty comprised two main parts:

- The first six articles clearly defined the Guatemala-Belize border, with Guatemala acknowledging British sovereignty over Belize.
- The seventh article addressed the construction of a road between Guatemala City and the Caribbean coast. This road was intended to benefit both parties: Belize needed a route to the Pacific coast to enhance its commercial relevance, while Guatemala sought improved communication with its Atlantic coast. However, the road was never built due to disagreements over its location and the subsequent change in government in Guatemala in 1871, which led the liberal government to declare the treaty void.

Among those who signed the treaty was José Milla y Vidaurre, who was working with Aycinena in the Foreign Ministry at the time. Carrera ratified the treaty on 1 May 1859, and Charles Lennox Wyke, British consul in Guatemala, secured royal approval in Great Britain on 26 September 1859. American consul Beverly Clarke, along with some liberal representatives, objected, but the issue was resolved.

In 1850, Guatemala's population was estimated at 600,000.

Guatemala's "Liberal Revolution" occurred in 1871 under the leadership of Justo Rufino Barrios, who aimed to modernize the country, improve trade, and introduce new crops and manufacturing. During this period, coffee became an important crop for Guatemala. Barrios also had ambitions of reuniting Central America and waged war in an unsuccessful attempt to achieve this goal, ultimately losing his life on the battlefield in El Salvador in 1885.

==== Justo Rufino Barrios government ====
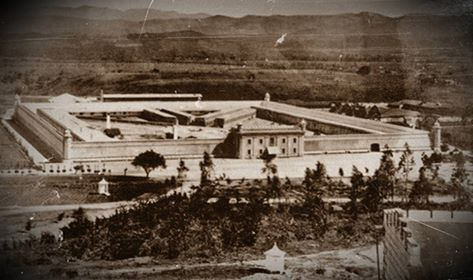
Guatemalan National Penitentiary, built by Barrios to incarcerate and torture his political enemies

The Conservative government in Honduras supported a group of Guatemalan Conservatives seeking to reclaim control of their government, prompting Barrios to declare war on Honduras. Concurrently, Barrios, along with President Luis Bogran of Honduras, declared their intention to reunify the old United Provinces of Central America.

During his tenure, Barrios pursued the liberal reforms initiated by García Granados but was more aggressive in their implementation. A summary of his reforms includes:

- Definitive separation between Church and State: He expelled the regular clergy, similar to Morazán's actions in 1829, and confiscated their properties.

Regular order	Coat of arms	Clergy type	Confiscated properties
Order of Preachers		Regular	Monasteries; Large extensions of farmland; Sugar mills; Indian doctrines (Note: This were communities of native Guatemalans that worked for the farms and sugar mills of the friars.)
Mercedarians		Regular	Monasteries; Large extensions of farmland; Sugar mills; Indian doctrines
Society of Jesus		Regular	The Jesuits had been expelled from the Spanish colonies in 1765 and did not return to Guatemala until 1852. By 1871, they did not hold significant possessions.
Recoletos		Regular	Monasterires
Conceptionists		Regular	Monasteries; Large expanses of farmland
Archdiocese of Guatemala		Secular	School and Trentin Seminar of Nuestra Señora de la Asunción
Congregation of the Oratory		Secular	Church buildings and housing in Guatemala City were destroyed by presidential order.

- Forbidden mandatory tithing to weaken secular clergy members and the archbishop.
- Established civil marriage as the only official form of marriage in the country.
- Created secular cemeteries.
- Made civil records supersede religious ones.
- Implemented secular education across the country.
- Established free and mandatory elementary schools.
- Closed the Pontifical University of San Carlos and created the secular National University in its place.

Barrios had a National Congress entirely devoted to his will, enabling him to create a new constitution in 1879 that allowed for his reelection as president for another six-year term.

He was also intolerant of political opponents, forcing many to flee the country and constructing the infamous Guatemalan Central Penitentiary, where numerous individuals were incarcerated and tortured.

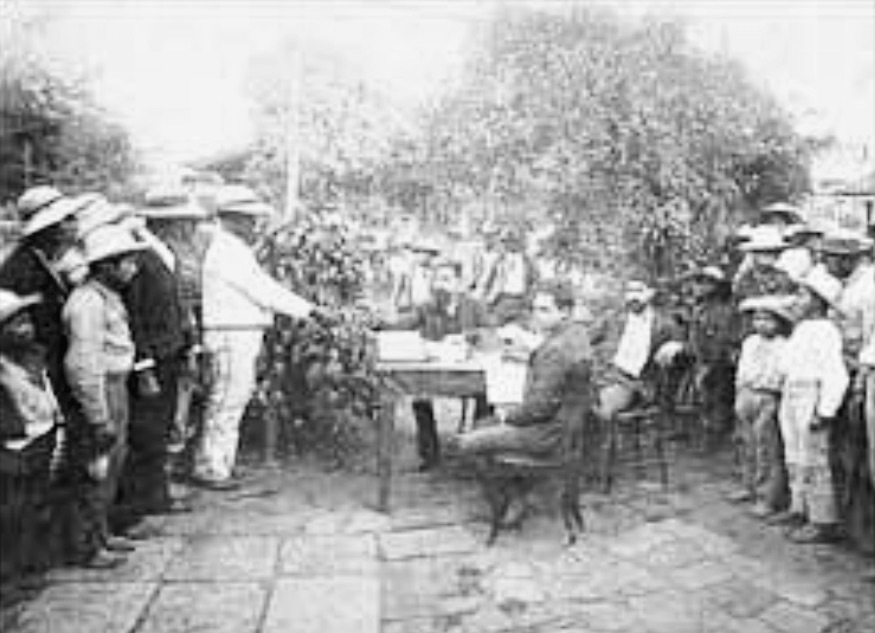
Day laborers receiving their pay in Santa Rosa, circa 1890, as per the Day Laborer Regulations established by Barrios

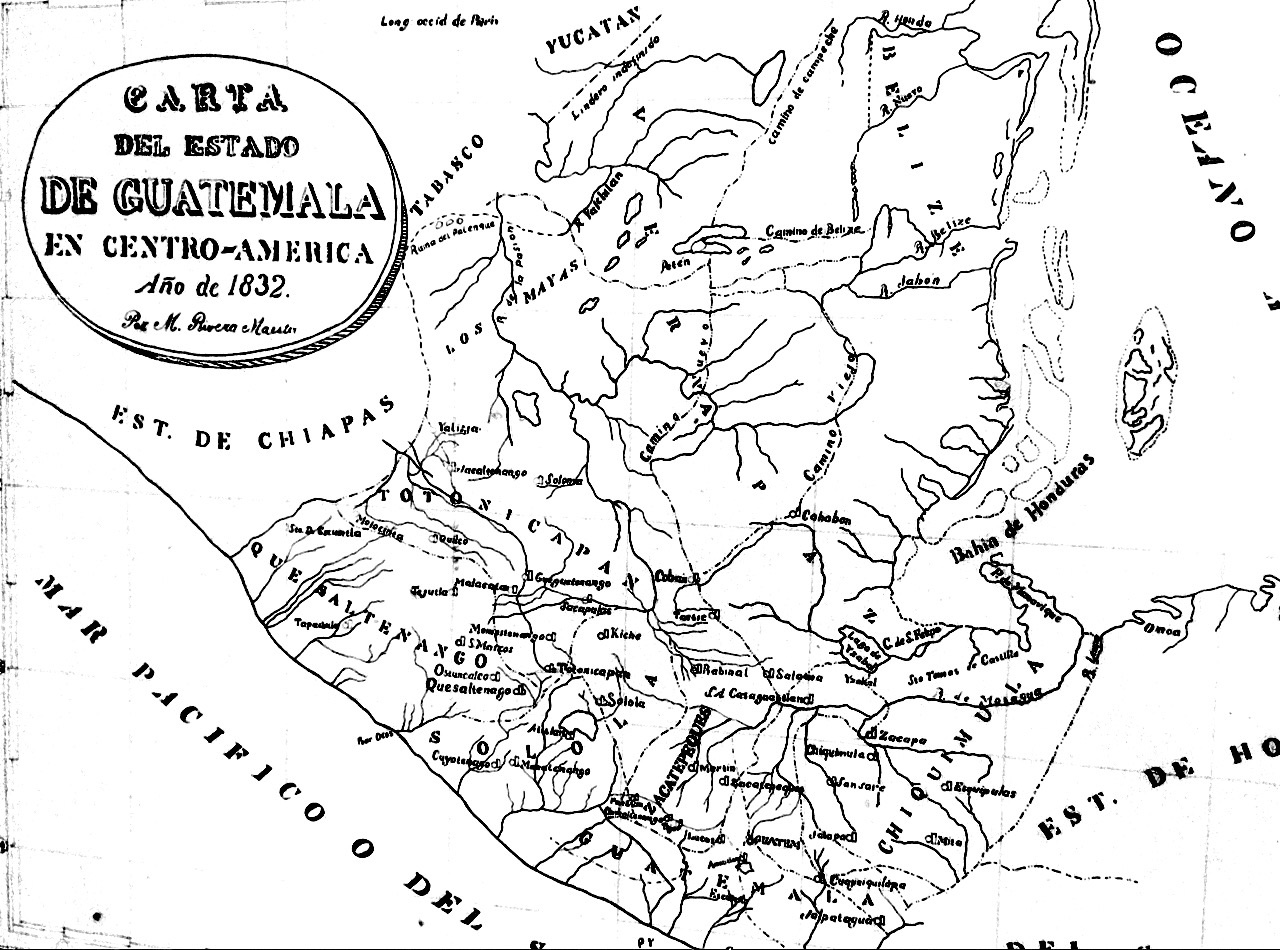
Guatemalan territory during the conservative regimes of Rafael Carrera and Vicente Cerna. The Soconusco territories were ceded to Mexico in exchange for support during the Liberal revolution of 1871, as stipulated by the Herrera-Mariscal Treaty of 1882.

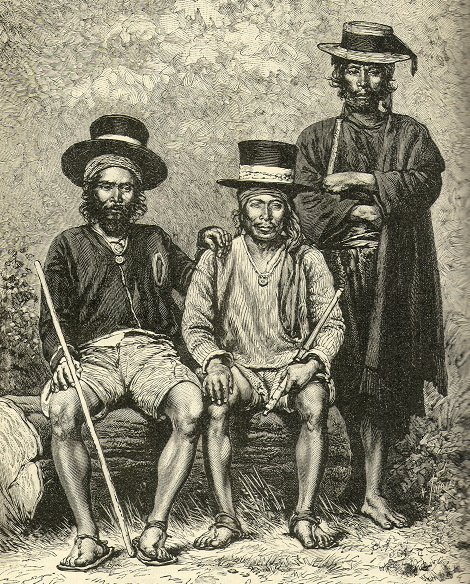
Town alcaldes of Highland Guatemala in traditional dress, 1891

During Barrios' tenure, the lands of the Maya, which had been strongly defended by the conservative regime of Rafael Carrera, were confiscated and redistributed among the officers who had supported him during the Liberal Revolution of 1871. Decree #170 (also known as the Census Redemption Decree) facilitated the confiscation of these lands in favor of army officers and German settlers in Verapaz by allowing the public sale of Maya communal lots. Consequently, a fundamental characteristic of the productive system during Barrios' regime was the concentration of large tracts of land among a few owners and a form of "farmland servitude" based on the exploitation of Maya day laborers.

To ensure a steady supply of day laborers for the coffee plantations, Barrios' government enacted the Day Laborer Regulations, which placed the entire native population at the disposal of both new and traditional Guatemalan landlords. The regular clergy, eventually expelled from the country and stripped of their properties, were exempt from this legislation. The decree stipulated the following for native Guatemalans:

1. They were legally obligated to work on farms when required by the owners, regardless of their native towns' locations.
2. They were under the control of local authorities, who ensured that laborers were dispatched to farms as needed.
3. They were subject to habilitation: a form of forced advance payment that entrenched them in debt, allowing landlords to retain them on their land indefinitely.
4. The day laborer booklet: a document verifying that a laborer had no debts to their employer. Without this booklet, laborers were vulnerable to exploitation by local authorities and landlords.

In 1879, Guatemala ratified its first constitution as an independent nation, replacing the previous decree-based rule of the Conservador regime. In 1880, Barrios was reelected President for a six-year term. He unsuccessfully sought U.S. mediation to resolve the disputed boundary between Guatemala and Mexico.

==== Government of Manuel Lisandro Barillas ====
General Manuel Lisandro Barillas Bercián became interim president of Guatemala following the death of President Justo Rufino Barrios in the Battle of Chalchuapa in El Salvador in April 1885 and the resignation of first designate Alejandro Manuel Sinibaldi Castro. He executed a clever scheme: he visited the General Cemetery during Barrios's funeral and told the president of Congress, "Please prepare room and board for the 5,000 troops that I have waiting for my orders in Mixco." Fearing the threat, the Congress president declared Barillas interim president on the spot. By the time the deception was discovered, it was too late to reverse the decision.

Instead of calling for elections, as required, Barillas Bercián was declared President on 16 March 1886 and served until 1892.

During Barillas's government, the Carrera Theater was remodeled to commemorate the fourth centennial of the Discovery of America. The Italian community in Guatemala donated a statue of Christopher Columbus (Cristóbal Colón in Spanish), which was placed next to the theater. The venue was henceforth known as the "Colón Theater".

In 1892, Barillas called for elections to attend to his personal affairs. This was the first election in Guatemala where candidates were allowed to campaign in local newspapers.

Barillas Bercián was unique among Guatemalan liberal presidents from 1871 to 1944 for peacefully transferring power to his successor. As elections approached, he invited the three Liberal candidates to present their government plans. Satisfied with the proposal from General Reyna Barrios, Barillas ensured that a large group of Indigenous people from Quetzaltenango and Totonicapán were mobilised to vote for Reyna Barrios. Reyna was elected president. To avoid offending the losing candidates, Barillas provided them with checks to cover their campaign expenses. Reyna Barrios assumed the presidency on 15 March 1892.

=== 20th century ===
In the 1890s, the United States began implementing the Monroe Doctrine, expelling European colonial powers and establishing U.S. hegemony over resources and labor in Latin American nations. The dictators who ruled Guatemala during the late 19th and early 20th centuries were generally very accommodating to U.S. business and political interests. Consequently, unlike other Latin American nations such as Haiti, Nicaragua, and Cuba, the U.S. did not need to use overt military force to maintain dominance in Guatemala. The Guatemalan military and police worked closely with the U.S. military and State Department to secure U.S. interests. The Guatemalan government exempted several U.S. corporations from paying taxes, particularly the United Fruit Company, privatized and sold off publicly owned utilities, and transferred large tracts of public land.

==== Manuel Estrada Cabrera regime (1898–1920) ====
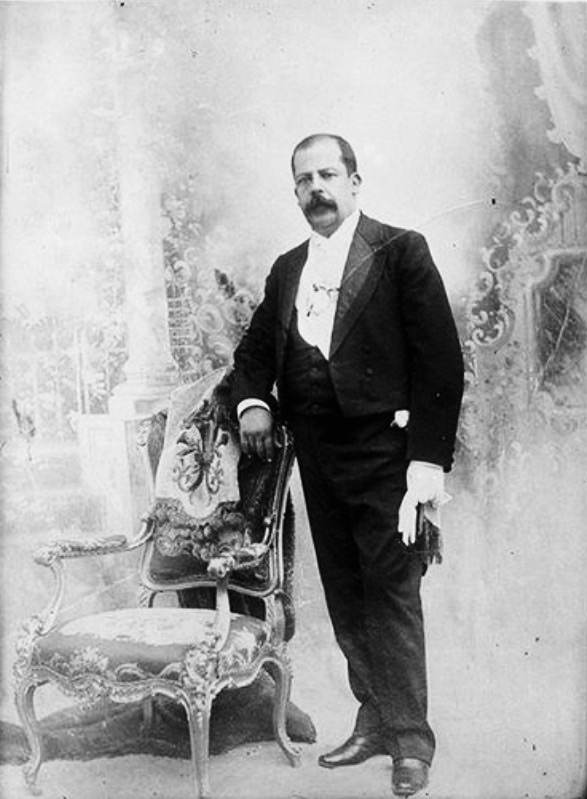
Manuel Estrada Cabrera ruled Guatemala from 1898 to 1920.

After the assassination of General José María Reina Barrios on 8 February 1898, the Guatemalan cabinet convened an emergency meeting to appoint a new successor but did not invite Estrada Cabrera to the meeting, despite him being the First Designated to the Presidency. There are two versions of how he managed to become president:

- (a) Estrada Cabrera entered "with pistol drawn" to assert his entitlement to the presidency
- (b) Estrada Cabrera showed up unarmed and demanded the presidency, asserting his position as the First Designated

The first Guatemalan head of state from civilian life in over 50 years, Estrada Cabrera overcame resistance to his regime by August 1898 and called for September elections, which he won handily. At that time, Estrada Cabrera was 44 years old; he was stocky, of medium height, dark, and broad-shouldered. His mustache gave him a plebeian appearance. He had dark eyes, a metallic voice, and a rather sullen, brooding mien. His courage and character were evident on the night Reina Barrios died, when he stood in front of the ministers meeting in the Government Palace to choose a successor and said: Gentlemen, let me please sign this decree. As First Designated, you must hand me the Presidency. His first decree was a general amnesty, and his second was to reopen all elementary schools closed by Reina Barrios, both administrative and political measures aimed at gaining public support. Estrada Cabrera was almost unknown in the political circles of the capital, and the nature of his government and his intentions were unclear.

In 1898, the Legislature convened to elect President Estrada Cabrera, who triumphed due to the significant number of soldiers and policemen who voted in civilian clothing, as well as the large number of illiterate families they brought to the polls. Additionally, effective propaganda was disseminated through the official newspaper La Idea Liberal. The newspaper was managed by the poet Joaquín Méndez, with contributions from writers such as Enrique Gómez Carrillo, who had just returned from Paris and believed that Estrada Cabrera was the president Guatemala needed; Rafael Spinola; Máximo Soto Hall; and Juan Manuel Mendoza, who would later become Gómez Carrillo's biographer. In recognition of his work as a political propagandist, Gómez Carrillo was appointed General Consul in Paris with a monthly salary of 250 gold pesos and immediately returned to Europe.

One of Estrada Cabrera's most infamous legacies was his decision to allow the United Fruit Company to enter the Guatemalan economic and political arena. As a member of the Liberal Party, he aimed to develop the nation's infrastructure, including highways, railroads, and sea ports, to expand the export economy. By the time Estrada Cabrera assumed the presidency, there had been repeated efforts to construct a railroad from the major port of Puerto Barrios to the capital, Guatemala City. However, due to a lack of funding exacerbated by the collapse of the internal coffee trade, the railway fell 100 kilometres (60 mi) short of its goal. Estrada Cabrera decided, without consulting the legislature or judiciary, that making a deal with the United Fruit Company was the only way to complete the railway. In 1904, he signed a contract with UFCO's Minor Cooper Keith, granting the company tax exemptions, land grants, and control of all railroads on the Atlantic coast.

Estrada Cabrera often employed brutal methods to assert his authority, reflecting the tyrannical style of government in Guatemala at the time. Like his predecessors Rafael Carrera y Turcios and Justo Rufino Barrios, who had led similarly autocratic regimes, Cabrera began his first presidential term by prosecuting political rivals and establishing a well-organised network of spies. One American ambassador returned to the United States after learning that the dictator had ordered his poisoning. Former President Manuel Barillas was stabbed to death in Mexico City, outside the Mexican Presidential Residence, on Cabrera's orders; the street where this occurred is now named Calle Guatemala. Cabrera also responded violently to workers' strikes against the United Fruit Company (UFCO). In one instance, after the armed forces refused to intervene, UFCO went directly to Cabrera. The president then ordered an armed unit to enter the workers' compound, where they fired indiscriminately into the workers' sleeping quarters, wounding and killing an unspecified number of people.

In 1906, Cabrera faced serious revolts supported by some Central American governments, but he succeeded in suppressing them. Elections held against Cabrera's will resulted in the murder of the president-elect in retaliation. In 1907, the brothers Avila Echeverría, along with a group of associates, planned to kill Cabrera with a bomb. Despite their education at foreign universities and their prominent backgrounds, they returned to find a nation under constant fear and a president ruling without opposition.

The attack was carefully planned, but when Cabrera went for a carriage ride, the bomb exploded, killing the horse and driver but only slightly injuring the president. The attackers, unable to escape, took their own lives. Their families were subsequently imprisoned in the notorious Penitenciaría Central, where conditions were cruel and foul. Political prisoners were tortured daily, and their screams were heard throughout the penitentiary. Many prisoners died under these harsh conditions, as political crimes were not pardonable. It has been suggested that Estrada Cabrera's extreme despotic characteristics emerged following this attempt on his life in 1907.

Estrada Cabrera remained in power until he was forced to resign in 1920 due to new revolts. By this time, his power had significantly waned, and he was reliant on the loyalty of a few generals. Although the United States had threatened intervention if he were removed through revolution, a bipartisan coalition formed to oust him. He was deposed after the national assembly declared him mentally incompetent and was replaced by Carlos Herrera on 8 April 1920.

In 1920, Prince Wilhelm of Sweden visited Guatemala and provided an objective account of Guatemalan society and the Estrada Cabrera government in his book Between Two Continents: Notes from a Journey in Central America, 1920. The prince described Guatemalan society as having three sharply defined classes:

- Criollos: A minority descended from Spanish conquerors who, by 1920, were heavily mixed with foreigners and had significant indigenous ancestry. They dominated both politics and intellectual life due to their superior education compared to the rest of the population and their control over much of the country's cultivated land.
- Ladinos: The middle class, comprising individuals of mixed indigenous, black, and Criollo ancestry. In 1920, they held minimal political power and were primarily artisans, storekeepers, tradesmen, and minor officials. Agricultural laborers were also found in the eastern part of the country.
- Indians (Maya): A large, uneducated group that was disinclined to change. They were a major part of the agricultural workforce and were often employed as soldiers due to their respect for authority. They were divided into three categories:
  - "Mozos colonos": Settled on plantations with a small piece of land for personal cultivation, working on plantations for part of the year.
  - "Mozos jornaleros": Day-laborers hired for specific periods, paid daily wages. Although theoretically free, they were often bound by debt to their employers, making it difficult to leave. If they attempted to escape, they could be pursued and imprisoned at their own expense.
  - Independent tillers: Residing in remote areas, they grew crops such as maize, wheat, or beans for personal use and occasional sale in town markets, sometimes traveling up to 40 km (25 mi) to do so.

==== Jorge Ubico regime (1931–1944) ====
In 1931, General Jorge Ubico came to power, supported by the United States, and established one of the most repressive regimes in Central American history. Like his predecessor, Estrada Cabrera, Ubico created an extensive network of spies and informants, resulting in the torture and execution of numerous political opponents. A wealthy aristocrat (with an estimated income of $215,000 per year in 1930s dollars) and a staunch anti-communist, Ubico consistently aligned himself with the United Fruit Company, Guatemalan landowners, and urban elites in conflicts with peasants. Following the 1929 New York Stock Exchange crash, the peasant system established by Barrios in 1875, which had initially stimulated coffee production, became inadequate. Ubico then imposed a system of debt slavery and forced labour to ensure a sufficient workforce for the coffee plantations and UFCO operations.

Allegedly, Ubico enacted laws permitting landowners to execute workers as a "disciplinary" measure. He openly identified as a fascist, admiring Mussolini, Franco, and Hitler, and once stated, "I am like Hitler. I execute first and ask questions later." Ubico expressed disdain for the indigenous population, describing them as "animal-like" and arguing that they required mandatory military training to become "civilized," likening it to "domesticating donkeys." He granted hundreds of thousands of hectares to the United Fruit Company (UFCO), exempted them from taxes in Tiquisate, and allowed the U.S. military to establish bases in Guatemala.

Ubico viewed himself as a modern-day Napoleon, dressing ostentatiously and surrounding himself with statues and paintings of the emperor. He frequently remarked on their similarities. He militarised various political and social institutions—including the post office, schools, and symphony orchestras—and appointed military officers to many government positions. Ubico regularly conducted "inspections" throughout the country, accompanied by a military escort, a mobile radio station, an official biographer, and cabinet members.

On the other hand, Ubico was an efficient administrator:

- His new decrees, though unfair to most of the indigenous population, benefitted the Guatemalan economy during the Great Depression, as they boosted coffee production nationwide.
- He reduced bureaucrats' salaries by nearly half, helping to curb inflation.
- He maintained peace and order in Guatemala City by effectively combating crime.

==== October Revolution (1944) ====
After 14 years, Ubico's repressive policies and arrogant demeanor led to passive resistance by urban middle-class intellectuals, professionals, and junior army officers in 1944. On 25 June, a peaceful demonstration by female schoolteachers was suppressed by government troops, resulting in the assassination of María Chinchilla, who became a national heroine. On 1 July 1944, Ubico resigned amidst a general strike and nationwide protests. Initially, he planned to hand over power to former police director General Roderico Anzueto, whom he believed he could control. However, his advisors noted that Anzueto's pro-Nazi sympathies had made him highly unpopular and unmanageable by the military. Consequently, Ubico selected a triumvirate of Major General Bueneventura Piñeda, Major General Eduardo Villagrán Ariza, and General Federico Ponce Vaides. The three generals promised to convene the national assembly to elect a provisional president. However, when Congress met on 3 July, soldiers held everyone at gunpoint and forced them to vote for General Ponce instead of the popular civilian candidate, Dr. Ramón Calderón. Ponce, who had previously retired from military service due to alcoholism, took orders from Ubico and retained many officials from the Ubico administration, continuing its repressive policies.

Opposition groups began organizing again, joined by many prominent political and military leaders who deemed the Ponce regime unconstitutional. Among the military officers in the opposition were Jacobo Árbenz and Major Francisco Javier Arana. Ubico had fired Árbenz from his teaching post at the Escuela Politécnica, and since then, Árbenz had been living in El Salvador, organizing a group of revolutionary exiles. On 19 October 1944, a small group of soldiers and students led by Árbenz and Arana attacked the National Palace in what became known as the "October Revolution". Ponce was defeated and driven into exile, and Árbenz, Arana, and lawyer Jorge Toriello established a junta. They declared that democratic elections would be held before the end of the year.

The winner of the 1944 elections was Juan José Arévalo Bermejo, PhD, a teaching major who had earned a scholarship in Argentina during General Lázaro Chacón's government due to his outstanding teaching skills. Arévalo spent several years in South America, working as a university professor in various countries. When he returned to Guatemala during the early years of Jorge Ubico's regime, his colleagues asked him to propose the creation of the Faculty of Humanism at the National University, a project to which Ubico was strongly opposed. Recognising Ubico's dictatorial nature, Arévalo left Guatemala and returned to Argentina. After the 1944 Revolution, he came back to Guatemala and ran under a coalition of leftist parties known as the Partido Acción Revolucionaria (Revolutionary Action Party, PAR), winning 85% of the vote in elections widely considered to have been fair and open.

Arévalo implemented social reforms, including minimum wage laws, increased educational funding, near-universal suffrage (excluding illiterate women), and labor reforms. However, many of these changes primarily benefited the upper-middle classes and did little for the peasant agricultural laborers who constituted the majority of the population. Although his reforms were relatively moderate, he was widely disliked by the United States government, the Catholic Church, large landowners, employers such as the United Fruit Company, and Guatemalan military officers, who viewed his government as inefficient, corrupt, and heavily influenced by communists. At least 25 coup attempts occurred during his presidency, mostly led by wealthy liberal military officers.

==== Presidency of Juan José Arévalo (1945–1951) ====
Árbenz served as defense minister under President Arévalo, becoming the first to hold this position after it had previously been called the Ministry of War. In 1947, Dr. Arévalo, along with a friend and two Russian dancers visiting Guatemala, was involved in a car accident on the road to Panajachel. Arévalo fell into a ravine and was seriously injured, while all his companions were killed. The official party leaders then signed a pact with Lieutenant Colonel Arana, in which he pledged not to attempt a coup against the ailing president in exchange for being recognized by the revolutionary parties as the official candidate in the next election. However, Arévalo's recovery was almost miraculous, and he was soon able to resume governing. Lieutenant Colonel Francisco Javier Arana had agreed to the pact because he wanted to be seen as a democratic hero of the uprising against Ponce, and he believed the Barranco Pact secured his position for the upcoming presidential elections.

Arana was a highly influential figure in Arévalo's government and had secured his nomination as the next presidential candidate, surpassing Captain Árbenz, who was told that due to his young age, he would have no difficulty waiting for his turn in the subsequent election. Arana died in a gun battle against a military civilian attempting to capture him on 18 July 1949, at the Bridge of Glory in Amatitlán, where he and his assistant commander had gone to inspect weapons that had been seized at the Aurora Air Base a few days earlier. There are varying accounts of who ambushed him and who ordered the attack; both Arbenz and Arévalo have been accused of orchestrating an attempt to remove Arana from the presidential race.

The death of Lieutenant Colonel Arana is of critical importance in the history of Guatemala, as it marked a turning point in the Guatemalan revolution. His death not only cleared the path for Colonel Árbenz to be elected president in 1950 but also triggered a major crisis in the government of Dr. Arévalo Bermejo. Suddenly, Arévalo faced opposition from an army more loyal to Arana than to him, as well as from elite civilian groups who seized the opportunity to protest vigorously against his administration.

Before his death, Arana had planned to run in the upcoming 1950 presidential elections. His death left Árbenz without any significant rivals, which led some, including the CIA and U.S. military intelligence, to speculate that Árbenz had him eliminated for this reason. Árbenz received more than three times as many votes as the runner-up, Miguel Ydígoras Fuentes. Fuentes claimed that electoral fraud had benefited Árbenz; however, scholars have noted that while fraud may have given Árbenz some votes, it was not the reason for his victory. In 1950s Guatemala, only literate men could vote by secret ballot; illiterate men and literate women voted by open ballot, while illiterate women were not enfranchised at all.

For the 1950 campaign, Árbenz asked José Manuel Fortuny, a high-ranking member of the Guatemalan Communist Party, to write some of his speeches. The central theme of these speeches was land reform, Árbenz's "pet project." Árbenz won a comfortable victory in the late 1950 elections, after which he and Fortuny collaborated closely on government tasks. While many leaders of the ruling coalition sought personal benefits from their proximity to the president, the leaders of the Guatemalan Labor Party, especially Fortuny, were among Árbenz's closest advisers.

The election of Árbenz alarmed U.S. State Department officials, who remarked that Arana had always represented the "only positive conservative element" in the Arévalo administration, that his death would "materially strengthen the Left," and that "developments forecast a sharp leftist trend within the government."

==== Presidency of Jacobo Árbenz Guzman (1951–1954) ====
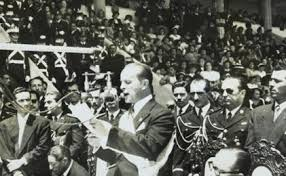
Inauguration of Colonel Jacobo Árbenz as President of Guatemala, 1951.

In his inaugural address, Árbenz promised to transform Guatemala from "a backward country with a predominantly feudal economy into a modern capitalist state". He declared his intent to reduce dependency on foreign markets and diminish the influence of foreign corporations on Guatemalan politics. He also stated that he would modernize Guatemala's infrastructure without relying on foreign capital.

Based on his government plan, he:

1. Promulgated Decree 900, expropriating idle land from UFCO.
2. Began construction of the Atlantic Highway.
3. Initiated construction of the Santo Tomas de Castilla port, where Puerto Matías de Gálvez used to be, to compete with UFCO's Puerto Barrios.
4. Began studies for the Jurun Marinalá generation plant to compete with the American-owned electric company.

Árbenz was a Christian socialist and governed as a Western European-style social democrat and democratic socialist. According to historian Stephen Schlesinger, while Árbenz had a few communists in lower-level positions in his administration, he "was not a dictator, he was not a crypto-communist." Nonetheless, some of his policies, particularly his agrarian reforms, were branded "communist" by Guatemala's upper classes and the United Fruit Company.

===== Land reform =====
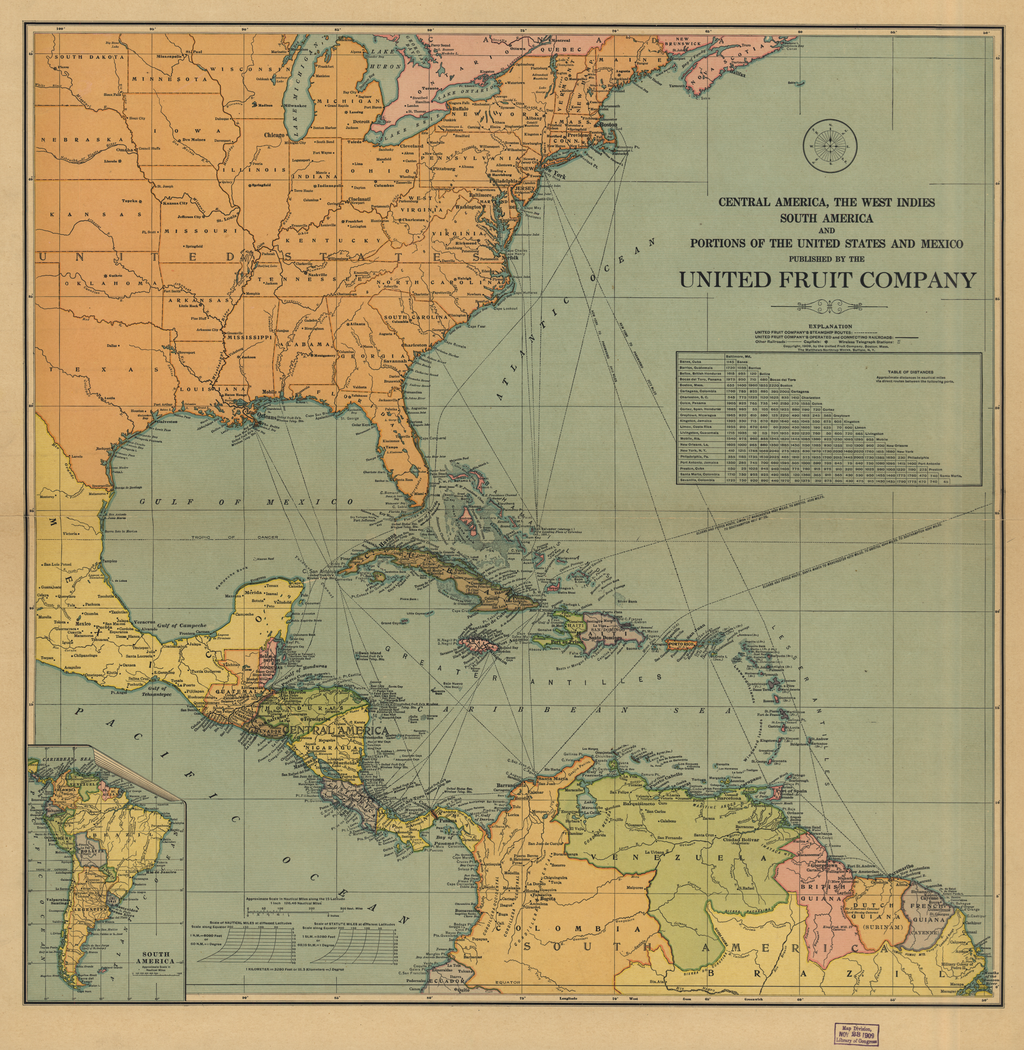
Route map of the Great White Fleet of the United Fruit Company, which held a monopoly on freight and passenger maritime transport to and from Puerto Barrios in Guatemala since 1903.

Prior to Árbenz's election in 1950, a handful of U.S. corporations controlled Guatemala's primary electrical utilities, the nation's only railroad, and the banana industry, which was Guatemala's chief agricultural export. By the mid-1940s, Guatemalan banana plantations accounted for more than one-quarter of all of the United Fruit Company's production in Latin America. Land reform was the centerpiece of Árbenz's election campaign. The revolutionary organizations that had helped put Árbenz in power applied constant pressure on him to fulfill his campaign promises regarding land reform. Árbenz continued Arévalo's reform agenda, and in June 1952, his government enacted an agrarian reform program. Árbenz made land reform his central goal, as only 2% of the population owned 70% of the land.

On 17 June 1952, Árbenz's administration enacted an agrarian reform law known as Decree 900. The law empowered the government to create a network of agrarian councils, which would be in charge of expropriating uncultivated land on estates larger than 272 hectares (672 acres). The land was then allocated to individual families. Owners of expropriated land were compensated according to the value claimed in May 1952 tax assessments, which they had often dramatically understated to avoid paying taxes. The land was paid for in 25-year bonds with a 3% interest rate. The program was in effect for 18 months, during which it distributed 600,000 hectares (1,500,000 acres) to about 100,000 families. Árbenz himself, a landowner through his wife, gave up 700 hectares (1,700 acres) of his own land in the land reform program.

In 1953, the reform was ruled unconstitutional by the Supreme Court; however, the democratically elected Congress later impeached four judges associated with the ruling.

Decree 900, which implemented Agrarian Reform in Guatemala, provided the opportunity for landless field workers to cultivate crops. The effect of this law was similar to what occurred in Europe after the bubonic plague in the Middle Ages. After the plague, which killed one-third of Europe's population, the number of landowners decreased, releasing much of the land, increasing supply, and lowering land prices. Simultaneously, many farmers died, reducing the labor force, which, in turn, led to higher wages. The economic effects of the plague mirrored those of Guatemala's land reform. During the first harvest after the law's implementation, the average income of farmers increased from Q225.00 per year to Q700.00 per year. Some analysts argue that conditions in Guatemala improved after the reform, leading to a "fundamental transformation of agricultural technology due to the reduced labor supply." Similarly, rising living standards and large-scale technological advances occurred in Europe during the fifteenth century, with the missing workforce acting as "the mother of invention." The reform's benefits extended beyond the working class, resulting in increased consumption, production, and domestic private investment.

===== Construction of transport infrastructure =====
Map of railway lines in Guatemala and El Salvador, owned by the IRCA, a subsidiary of the United Fruit Company that controlled the railroads in both countries. The only Atlantic port was controlled by the Great White Fleet, also a UFCO company.

To establish the necessary physical infrastructure for "independent" and national capitalist development, and reduce extreme dependence on the United States while breaking the American monopolies in the country—primarily those controlling the banana enclave economy—Árbenz and his government began planning and constructing the Atlantic Highway. This highway aimed to compete with the United Fruit Company's (UFCO) monopoly on land transport, which was managed through its subsidiary, the International Railways of Central America (IRCA). The IRCA had held this concession since 1904, granted by then-President Manuel Estrada Cabrera. Construction of the highway was initiated by the Roads Department of the Ministry of Communications, with assistance from the military engineering battalion. The highway was designed to run parallel to the railway line wherever possible. Additionally, the construction of a new port was intended to challenge another UFCO monopoly: Puerto Barrios, which was exclusively owned and operated by The Great White Fleet, another UFCO subsidiary.

===== National power plant Jurun Marinalá =====
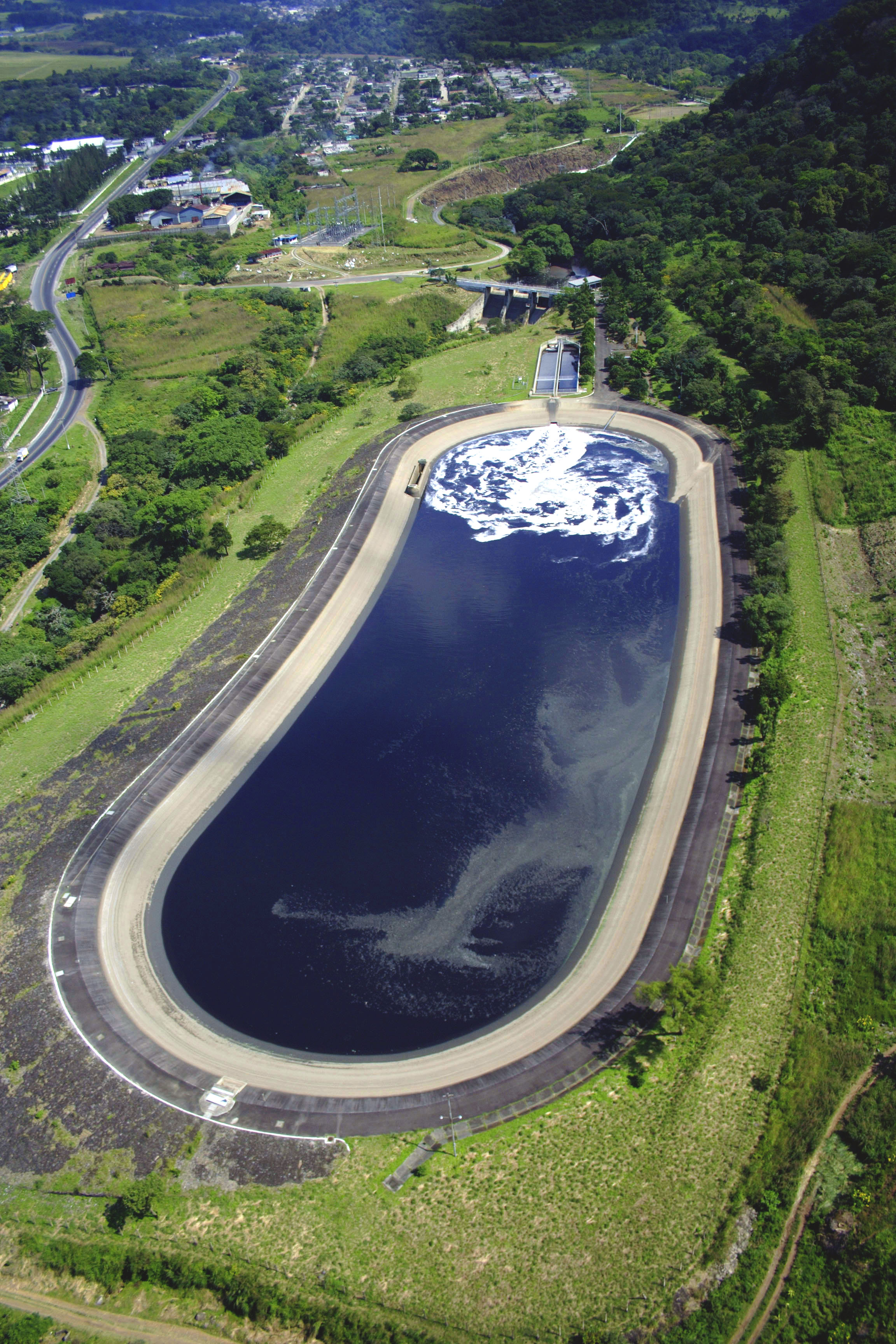
The Jurun Marinalá power plant was conceived during the Árbenz government to compete with the Electricity Company of Guatemala, which was then an American company using foreign oil instead of Guatemala's natural resources. Construction of the plant was not completed until 1968, fourteen years after Árbenz was removed in a CIA-sponsored coup d'état in 1954.

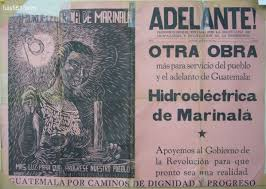
Advertisement for the Marinalá power plant during the Árbenz government

The Jurun Marinalá electric power generation plant was planned as Guatemala's first national hydroelectric power plant. Its goal was to challenge the monopoly of the Electric Company, a subsidiary of American Electric Bond and Share Company (Ebasco), which used fossil fuels instead of local water resources, thus draining foreign currency reserves. Due to its significant economic importance, construction continued beyond the Árbenz presidency and was completed under President Julio César Méndez Montenegro in 1968. The plant is located in the village of Agua Blanca, within El Salto, Escuintla.

===== Catholic national pilgrimage campaign against communism =====
The Catholic Church, which held significant power in Central America during the Colonial Era, gradually lost its influence following independence from Spain. Initially, the rise of liberal forces displaced the conservative Guatemalan elites, including senior clergy, who had previously wielded considerable power. By 1838, with the fall of liberal President Mariano Gálvez, Lieutenant General Rafael Carrera emerged as the conservative leader. Carrera restored the Church's influence in Guatemala, which became the last bastion of conservatism in the region. The Central American Federation, which was liberal in nature, could not be established due to Carrera's military power, and he eventually founded the Republic of Guatemala on 21 March 1847. After Carrera's death in 1865, Guatemalan Liberals seized the opportunity to reclaim power, leading to the Liberal Revolution of 1871. This period saw increased attacks on the senior clergy, secular education, freedom of religion, the expulsion of religious orders, and the expropriation of church properties. These policies continued through subsequent liberal governments until the October Revolution of 1944, which worsened the situation as revolutionary factions became increasingly anti-religious.

By 1951, Archbishop Mariano Rossell y Arellano sought to restore the Catholic Church's elite position in Guatemala. He allied with the United Fruit Company and the National Liberation Movement, aiming to overthrow the revolutionary government, which he denounced as atheists and communists. After the consecration of the Shrine of Esquipulas in 1950, Rossell y Arellano commissioned sculptor Julio Urruela Vásquez to create a replica of the Christ of Esquipulas. This bronze replica, established as a symbol of the national pilgrimage against communism, was appointed as the Commander in Chief of the National Liberation Movement's forces during the June 1954 invasion.

On 4 April 1954, Rossell y Arellano issued a pastoral letter condemning the progress of communism in the country and calling on Guatemalans to rise up against this common enemy of God and the nation. The letter was widely distributed throughout the country.

===== Agrarian Reform and UFCo conflict =====
In 1953, when the government implemented Agrarian Reform, its goal was to redistribute large holdings of unused land to peasants, both Latino and Amerindian, for subsistence farming. The reform expropriated 250,000 of the 350,000 hectares held by the United Fruit Company (UFCO) and, according to Decree 900, intended to redistribute this land for agricultural purposes. UFCO continued to hold thousands of hectares of pastureland and substantial forest reserves. The Guatemalan government offered the company Q 609,572 in compensation for the appropriated land. The company contested the expropriation with several legal arguments. It claimed the government had misinterpreted its own law, which was meant to target unused land suitable for agricultural development. According to the company, land in pasture, forest cover, and under cultivation should have remained untouched. UFCO argued that most of the land taken was cultivated and in use, making the expropriation illegal.

Additionally, the company contended that the offered compensation was inadequate for the amount and value of the land taken. The valuations of UFCO's rural property were based on values declared in its tax filings. In 1945, Arevalo's administration ordered new assessments to be completed by 1948. UFCO submitted the assessment by the due date but later claimed that the values used for taxation purposes were outdated and did not reflect the true value of the land. The government had investigated in 1951, but a new assessment was never completed. UFCO argued that the 1948 assessment was outdated and estimated that just compensation should be as high as Q 15,854,849, nearly twenty times more than what the Guatemalan government had offered.

The U.S. State Department and embassy actively supported the position of UFCO, a major U.S. company. The Guatemalan government faced significant pressure as a result. While the U.S. officially acknowledged Guatemala's right to conduct its own politics and business, U.S. representatives claimed they were protecting UFCO, a company that generated substantial revenue and contributed to the U.S. economy. Arbenz's administration maintained that Agrarian Reform was essential for improving Guatemala's economy. He insisted on adopting nationalist economic policies if necessary, stating that all foreign investments would be subject to Guatemalan laws. Arbenz was resolute in promoting Agrarian Reform and, within a few years, acted decisively. He asserted that the Guatemalan government could not make exceptions for the U.S. concerning Decree 900 and that it was not Guatemala's fault that UFCO had understated the value of its land on tax forms.

As Arbenz resisted pressure to reconsider the expropriation of UFCO's land, his government was targeted by propaganda. For the U.S., national security concerns were paramount, intertwining political and economic interests. The fear of communist influence was shared by Guatemala's urban elite and middle classes, who were reluctant to relinquish their privileges. Local media outlets, such as the newspapers El Imparcial and La Hora, exploited press freedoms under the regime and, with UFCO's sponsorship, criticized communism and the government's legal recognition of the Communist Party. Opposing political parties organized anti-communism campaigns, drawing large crowds to rallies and steadily increasing membership in anti-communist organizations.

===== Arrival of John Peurifoy to Guatemala =====
Between 1950 and 1955, during General Eisenhower's presidency in the United States, a witch hunt for communists known as McCarthyism was conducted. This period was marked by the persecution of innocent people based on mere suspicion, leading to unfounded accusations, interrogations, job losses, passport denials, and even imprisonment. These methods of social control and repression in the U.S. bordered on totalitarian and fascist practices.

One of the key figures of McCarthyism was John Peurifoy, who was appointed U.S. Ambassador to Guatemala. Guatemala was the first country in the American sphere of influence after World War II to include openly communist elements in its government. Peurifoy, who had previously engaged in anti-communist activities in Greece, was installed as ambassador in November 1953, around the time Carlos Castillo Armas was organizing his small revolutionary army. After a lengthy meeting, Peurifoy informed President Arbenz that the U.S. was concerned about the communist elements in his government. He reported to the Department of State that while Arbenz himself was not a communist, it was likely that a communist leader would follow him. In January 1954, he told Time magazine, "American public opinion could force us to take some measures to prevent Guatemala from falling into the orbit of international communism."

===== Operation PBSuccess =====
The Communist Party was not the focal point of the communist movement in Guatemala until Jacobo Árbenz came to power in 1951. Prior to 1951, communism existed within urban labor forces in small study groups from 1944 to 1953, exerting considerable influence on these groups. Despite its limited size in Guatemala, many Communist leaders were highly vocal about their beliefs, particularly through protests and literature. In 1949, the Communist Party had fewer than forty members in Congress, but by 1953, this number had increased to nearly four thousand. Before Árbenz came to power, the communist movement largely operated through mass organizations. Following Árbenz's rise, the Guatemalan Communist Party expanded its activities into the public sphere.

Upon assuming power in 1951, Árbenz extended political freedoms, allowing communists in Guatemala to engage in politics. This policy enabled many opponents of Ubico's regime to identify as communists. By 1952, Árbenz implemented land reform, redistributing about 91,000 hectares (225,000 acres) of unused agricultural land from large landowners to rural workers and farmers. The land, primarily taken from the United Fruit Company, was to be compensated; however, the UFC argued that the compensation was insufficient. Meanwhile, Árbenz permitted the Communist Party to organize and include leaders, notably his leftist adviser. The propaganda campaign by the United Fruit Company against the Guatemalan revolution influenced the U.S. government to combat communism in Guatemala. The Eisenhower administration in the U.S. was displeased with Árbenz's government, viewing him as too aligned with communism. There were reports suggesting that Árbenz's wife was a communist and part of the Communist Party in Guatemala. Despite the lack of concrete evidence linking Guatemala to the Soviet Union, the U.S. was inclined to believe in the presence of communism in Guatemala.

As Árbenz proceeded with land reform, the United Fruit Company, which had a near-monopoly on Guatemalan fruit production and some industry, lobbied the Eisenhower administration to remove him. More significantly, there was widespread American concern about the potential establishment of a so-called "Soviet beachhead." Árbenz's sudden legalization of the Communist Party and the importation of arms from the Soviet-satellite state of Czechoslovakia, among other actions, convinced major policy makers in the White House and CIA to seek Árbenz's removal, despite his term being due to end naturally in two years. This led to a CIA-orchestrated coup in 1954, known as Operation PBSuccess, which resulted in Árbenz being toppled and forced into exile by Colonel Carlos Castillo Armas. Although many Guatemalans were committed to the original ideals of the 1944 uprising, some private sector leaders and military figures came to view Árbenz as a communist threat and supported his overthrow, hoping that his successor would continue the more moderate reforms initiated by Arevalo.

Armed and trained by the CIA, groups of Guatemalan exiles, commanded by Colonel Carlos Castillo Armas, invaded Guatemala on 18 June 1954. The Americans portrayed this as an anti-communist coup against Árbenz. Supported by CIA radio broadcasts, the Guatemalan army did not resist the coup, leading to Árbenz's resignation. In 1954, a military government replaced Árbenz's administration, disbanded the legislature, and arrested communist leaders, with Castillo Armas assuming the presidency.

Following the CIA coup, hundreds of Guatemalans were rounded up and killed. Documents obtained by the National Security Archive revealed that the CIA was involved in planning the assassinations of enemies of the new military government, should the coup prove successful.

==== 1976 earthquake ====
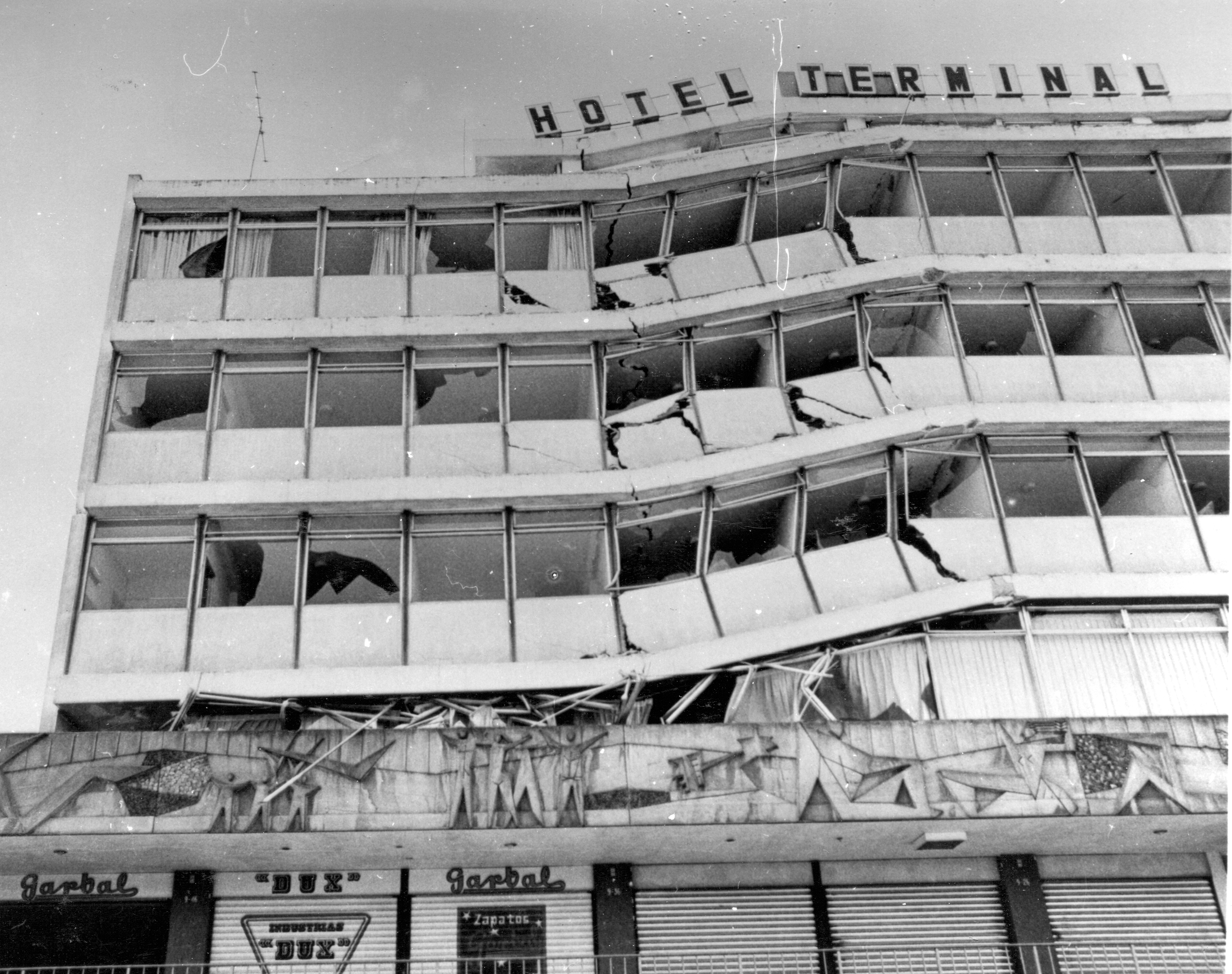
Damaged hotel in Guatemala City, 1976

==== Civil war (1960–1996) ====
The government, right-wing paramilitary organizations, and left-wing insurgents were all engaged in the Guatemalan Civil War (1960–96). Contributing factors included social and economic injustice, racial discrimination suffered by the indigenous population, the 1954 coup that reversed reforms, weak civilian control of the military, U.S. support for the government, and Cuban support for the insurgents. The Historical Clarification Commission (commonly known as the "Truth Commission") estimated that more than 200,000 people were killed, the vast majority of whom were indigenous civilians. 93% of the human rights abuses reported to the commission were attributed to the military or other government-supported forces. The commission also determined that the government was responsible for acts of genocide.

In response to the increasingly autocratic rule of Gen. Ydígoras Fuentes, who took power in 1958 following the murder of Col. Castillo Armas, a group of junior military officers revolted in 1960. When their revolt failed, several went into hiding and established close ties with Cuba. This group became the nucleus of the forces that mounted armed insurrection against the government for the next 36 years.

In 1966, the left-of-center former law professor Julio César Méndez Montenegro became President of Guatemala while holding the rank of civilian. However, the historical political odds were still in favor of the nation's military. Shortly after Méndez Montenegro took office, the Guatemalan army launched a major counterinsurgency campaign that largely dismantled the guerrilla movement in the countryside.

The guerrillas concentrated their attacks in Guatemala City, where they assassinated several prominent figures, including U.S. Ambassador John Gordon Mein in 1968. Despite these challenges, Méndez Montenegro successfully completed his four-year term as president before being succeeded by Army Colonel Carlos Manuel Arana Osorio in 1970. For nearly two decades thereafter, Méndez Montenegro was the only civilian to lead Guatemala until the inauguration of Vinicio Cerezo in 1986.

===== Franja Transversal del Norte =====
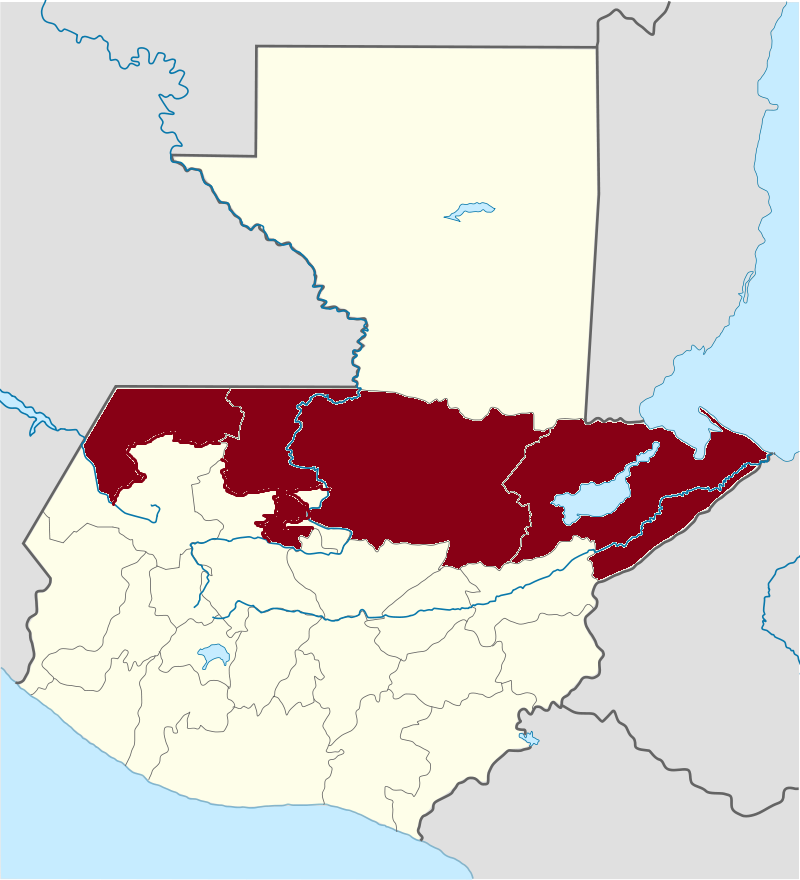
Location of the Franja Transversal del Norte (Northern Transversal Strip) in Guatemala

The first settler project in the FTN was established in Sebol-Chinajá in Alta Verapaz. Sebol, then regarded as a strategic point and route through the Cancuén River, communicated with Petén via the Usumacinta River on the border with Mexico. The only road at that time was a dirt track built by President Lázaro Chacón in 1928. In 1958, during General Miguel Ydígoras Fuentes's government, the Inter-American Development Bank (IDB) financed infrastructure projects in Sebol, which eventually adopted the name "Fray Bartolomé de las Casas," a municipality created in 1983 in Alta Verapaz. In 1960, then Army Captain Fernando Romeo Lucas García acquired the Saquixquib and Punta de Boloncó farms in northeastern Sebol. In 1963, he purchased the "San Fernando" farm, El Palmar de Sejux, and later acquired the "Sepur" farm near San Fernando. During these years, Lucas, a member of the Guatemalan legislature, lobbied Congress to boost investment in the region.

During this period, the region's importance lay in livestock, the exploitation of precious export wood, and archaeological wealth. Timber contracts were awarded to multinational companies such as Murphy Pacific Corporation from California, which invested US$30 million in the colonization of southern Petén and Alta Verapaz, forming the North Impulsadora Company. Colonization involved granting inhospitable areas of the FTN to native peasants.

In 1962, the DGAA became the National Institute of Agrarian Reform (INTA) through Decree 1551, which established the Agrarian Transformation Law. In 1964, INTA defined the FTN's geography as the northern part of the departments of Huehuetenango, Quiché, Alta Verapaz, and Izabal. That same year, priests from the Maryknoll order and the Order of the Sacred Heart, in collaboration with INTA, began the first colonization process, bringing settlers from Huehuetenango to the Ixcán sector in Quiché.

"It is of public interest and national emergency, the establishment of Agrarian Development Zones in the area included within the municipalities: San Ana Huista, San Antonio Huista, Nentón, Jacaltenango, San Mateo Ixcatán, and Santa Cruz Barillas in Huehuetenango; Chajul and San Miguel Uspantán in Quiché; Cobán, Chisec, San Pedro Carchá, Lanquín, Senahú, Cahabón and Chahal, in Alta Verapaz and the entire department of Izabal."

— Decreto 60–70, artítulo 1o.

The Northern Transversal Strip was officially established during General Carlos Arana Osorio's government in 1970, through Decree 60–70 in Congress, aimed at promoting agricultural development.

===== Guerrilla Army of the Poor =====
On 19 January 1972, members of a new Guatemalan guerrilla movement entered Ixcán from Mexico and were welcomed by many farmers. In 1973, after an exploratory mission into the municipal seat of Cotzal, the insurgent group decided to establish an underground camp in the mountains of Xolchiché, in the municipality of Chajul.

In 1974, the insurgent guerrilla group held its first conference, during which it outlined its strategy for the coming months and named itself the Guerrilla Army of the Poor (Ejército Guerrillero de los Pobres, EGP). By 1975, the organization had expanded its presence in the northern mountainous regions of the municipalities of Nebaj and Chajul. As part of its strategy, the EGP aimed to carry out actions that would gain public attention and symbolically represent the establishment of "social justice" against the inefficiency and ineffectiveness of the State's judicial and administrative systems. The group believed these actions would encourage the indigenous rural population to identify with the insurgency and join their cause. As part of this plan, they initiated so-called "executions." The EGP selected their targets based on complaints received from the public. For example, they chose Guillermo Monzón, a military commissioner in Ixcán, and José Luis Arenas, the largest landowner in the Ixcán area, who had been reported for allegedly having land conflicts with neighboring communities and abusing workers. (Note: José Luis Arenas, who at that time a journalist called "Ixcán Tiger" had been active in Guatemalan politics. He joined as Congress of Republic in the period of Jacobo Arbenz in the opposition; in 1952, he founded the Anti-communist Unification Party (AUP), which later became part of the liberationist movement; went into exile when the first armed clashes between the "Liberation Army" and the Guatemalan Army occurred, but returned with the victory of the National Liberation Movement and during the government of colonel Carlos Castillo Armas he held various public offices. In the presidential term of Carlos Arana Osorio (1970–1974) Arenas was in charge of the Promotion and Development of Petén (FYDEP). Later, he left politics for agriculture in his coffee and cardamom plantations in the Ixcán and Ixil, in Quiché.)

On Saturday, 7 June 1975, José Luis Arenas was killed by unknown assailants while at his farm "La Perla" to pay wage workers. Approximately two to three hundred people had gathered in front of his office to receive their payments, with four members of the EGP mingling among the farmers. The guerrillas then destroyed the farm's communication radio and executed Arenas. After the murder, the guerrilla members addressed the farmers in the Ixil language, identifying themselves as members of the Guerrilla Army of the Poor and stating that they had killed the "Tiger of Ixcán." They requested that animals be prepared to transport the injured to Chajul for medical treatment, after which they fled in that direction.

José Luis Arenas' son, who was in San Luis Ixcán at the time, sought refuge in a nearby mountain while waiting for a plane to take him to the capital to report the incident to the Minister of Defense. The minister responded, "You are mistaken, there are no guerrillas in the area."

===== Panzós massacre =====
In Alta Verapaz in the late nineteenth century German farmers came to concentrate in their hands three quarters of the total area of 8686 square kilometers that had the departmental territory. In this department came insomuch land grabbing and women [slaves] by German agricultural entrepreneurs, a political leader noted that farmers disappeared from their villages overnight, fleeing the farmers.

— Julio Castellanos Cambranes

Also located in the Northern Transversal Strip, the Polochic River Valley has been inhabited since ancient times by the K'ekchí and P'okomchi peoples. In the second half of the 19th century, President Justo Rufino Barrios began allocating land in the area to German farmers. Settlers from Germany arrived in the mid-19th century, acquired land, and established coffee plantations in Alta Verapaz and Quetzaltenango. Decree 170, also known as the Census Redemption Decree, facilitated the expropriation of indigenous lands in favor of the Germans by promoting the auction of communal lands. Since that time, the primary economic activity in the region has been export-oriented, especially in coffee, bananas, and cardamom. Communal property, previously used for subsistence farming, was converted to private property, leading to the mass cultivation and commercialization of agricultural products. Consequently, the Guatemalan production system has since been characterized by the concentration of land ownership in a few hands, along with a form of "farm servitude" based on the exploitation of "settler farmers". (Note: According to Guatemalan leftists, this term was essentially a euphemism for "native slaves".)

In 1951, an agrarian reform law was enacted to expropriate idle land from private owners, but after the 1954 National Liberation Movement coup, supported by the United States, most of the expropriated land was returned to its former owners. Flavio Monzón was appointed mayor and, over the next twenty years, became one of the largest landowners in the area. In 1964, several communities that had settled for decades along the Polochic River applied for property titles to INTA, which had been created in October 1962. However, the land was awarded to Monzón. A Mayan peasant from Panzós later recalled that Monzón "secured the signatures of the elders before going to INTA to discuss the land. When he returned, he gathered the people and said that, due to an INTA mistake, the land had been registered in his name." Throughout the 1970s, Panzós farmers continued to seek INTA's regularization of land ownership, receiving legal advice from FASGUA (Autonomous Trade Union Federation of Guatemala), an organization that supported the peasants' claims through legal procedures. However, no peasant ever received a property title. Some received promises, others obtained provisional titles, and some were only granted permission to plant. The peasants began facing evictions by farmers, the military, and local authorities, all of whom favored the economic interests of Izabal Mining Operations Company (EXMIBAL) and Transmetales. Another threat to peasant landowners at the time came from mining projects and oil exploration, with companies like Exxon, Shenandoah, Hispanoil, and Getty Oil holding exploration contracts. Additionally, there was a need for territorial expansion for two major projects of that era: the Northern Transversal Strip and the Chixoy Hydroelectric Plant.

In 1978, a military patrol was stationed a few kilometers from the county seat of Panzós, in a place called "Quinich." By this time, the organizational capacity of the peasants had increased, as they formed committees to claim titles to their land, a development that worried the landowning class. Some of these landowners, including Monzón, stated: "Several peasants living in villages and settlements want to burn urban areas to gain access to private property", and they requested protection from the governor of Alta Verapaz. (Note: In municipal act 34–64 (published 9 January 1965) one can see the first indication of military presence in the region, when it was written that it was imperative to incorporate order and security in the area.)

On 29 May 1978, peasants from the villages of Cahaboncito, Semococh, Rubetzul, Canguachá, Sepacay, the Moyagua plantation, and the La Soledad neighborhood decided to stage a public demonstration in the Plaza de Panzós to demand land rights and express their discontent over the arbitrary actions of landowners and civil and military authorities. Hundreds of men, women, and indigenous children gathered in the municipal square of Panzós, armed with tools, machetes, and sticks. One participant stated: "The idea was not to fight; we wanted clarification on the status of the land. People came from various places, and some had guns."

There are differing accounts of how the shooting started. Some say it began when "Mama Maquín," a prominent peasant leader, pushed a soldier who was blocking her way. Others suggest it started when the crowd surged forward, attempting to enter the municipality, which the soldiers interpreted as aggression. The mayor at the time, Walter Overdick, stated, "People in the middle of the group pushed those at the front." A witness recounted that a protester grabbed a soldier's gun but did not use it, while several others reported hearing a military voice shout, "One, two, three! Fire!" Ultimately, the lieutenant in charge of the troops ordered them to open fire on the crowd.

For about five minutes, gunfire rang out, with the soldiers using their regulation firearms and three machine guns positioned around the square. Several peasants armed with machetes injured soldiers, although no soldiers were shot. The square was left covered in blood.

Immediately after, the army sealed off the main access roads, while the indigenous people were reportedly "terrified." An army helicopter flew over the town before evacuating the wounded soldiers.

===== Transition between Laugerud and Lucas Garcia regimes =====
Due to his seniority within both the military and economic elites of Guatemala, as well as his fluency in Q'eqchi, one of the country's indigenous languages, Lucas García was seen as the ideal official candidate for the 1978 elections. To further bolster his image, he was paired with the left-leaning doctor Francisco Villagrán Kramer as his running mate. Villagrán Kramer, a man of recognized democratic principles who had participated in the 1944 Revolution, was connected to the interests of transnational corporations and elites, as he served as a key adviser to Guatemala's agricultural, industrial, and financial chambers. Despite the democratic appearance, Lucas García's electoral victory did not come easily, and the establishment had to impose him, which further discredited the electoral system – already tainted by fraud during the 1974 elections when General Laugerud was imposed.

In 1976, a student group called "FRENTE" emerged at the University of San Carlos, winning all student body positions up for election that year. The leaders of FRENTE were mostly members of the Patriotic Workers' Youth, the youth wing of the Guatemalan Labor Party (-Partido Guatemalteco del Trabajo- PGT), which had been operating covertly since its banning in 1954. Unlike other Marxist groups in Guatemala at the time, PGT leaders believed in gaining power through mass movements and elections.

FRENTE used its influence within the student associations to launch a political campaign for the 1978 university general elections, allied with leftist faculty members grouped under "University Vanguard." This alliance was successful, with Oliverio Castañeda de León being elected President of the Student Body and Saúl Osorio Paz becoming University President. Their PGT connections also helped them forge ties with the university workers' union (STUSC). Osorio Paz provided support to the student movement, and instead of creating conflict, different groups collaborated to build a higher education institution with a strong social focus. In 1978, the University of San Carlos became one of the most politically influential sectors in Guatemala. That year, the student movement, faculty, and University Governing Board -Consejo Superior Universitario- united against the government, advocating for greater opportunities for the country's most marginalized sectors. To expand its outreach, the Student Body (AEU) rehabilitated the "Student House" in downtown Guatemala City, where they provided support to politically sensitized villagers and peasant families. They also organized workers in the informal economy.

At the beginning of his tenure as president, Saúl Osorio founded the weekly Siete Días en la USAC, which not only reported on university activities but also consistently exposed human rights violations, particularly the repression of the popular movement. The publication also covered revolutionary movements in Nicaragua and El Salvador. For a short period, the state university became a united and progressive institution, preparing to confront the State directly.

FRENTE then had to contend with the radical left, represented by the Student Revolutionary Front "Robin García" (FERG), which emerged during the Labor Day march on 1 May 1978. FERG coordinated student associations across different colleges at the University of San Carlos and public secondary schools. This coordination between legal groups was linked to the Guerrilla Army of the Poor (EGP), a guerrilla group that had surfaced in 1972 and had its base in the oil-rich region of northern Quiché, specifically the Ixil Triangle of Ixcán, Nebaj, and Chajul in the Franja Transversal del Norte. Although not strictly an armed group, FERG frequently sought confrontation with government forces, often promoting actions that escalated into mass violence and paramilitary activities. Its members had no interest in working within institutional frameworks and never sought permission for public demonstrations or actions.

On 7 March 1978, Lucas García was elected president, and shortly after, on 29 May 1978, during the final days of General Laugerud García's government, a peaceful peasant demonstration in the central square of Panzós, Alta Verapaz, was attacked by members of the Zacapa Military Zone, resulting in numerous deaths. The demonstrators, indigenous peasants who had been called to the square, were fighting for the legalization of public lands they had occupied for years. Their struggle placed them in direct conflict with investors seeking to exploit the area's mineral wealth, particularly oil reserves controlled by Basic Resources International and Shenandoah Oil, and nickel reserves managed by EXMIBAL. The Panzós Massacre caused an uproar at the university due to the high number of victims, and conflicts arose over the exploitation of natural resources by foreign companies. In 1978, for example, Osorio Paz and other university members received death threats for their vocal opposition to the construction of an inter-oceanic pipeline intended to facilitate oil exploration. On 8 June, the AEU organized a massive protest in downtown Guatemala City, where speakers condemned the Panzós massacre and expressed their strongest opposition yet to the Laugerud García regime.

===== Escalation of violence =====
After the execution of José Luis Arenas, support for the new guerrilla movement increased among the populations of the villages of Hom, Ixtupil, Sajsivan, and Sotzil, neighbors of La Perla and its annexes. This was largely due to the ongoing land dispute between the peasants and the farm owners, with the execution being viewed as an act of "social justice."

The murder of the owner of the farm "La Perla," located in the municipality of Chajul, led to an escalation of violence in the region. While part of the population gravitated toward the guerrillas, others in Hom chose to distance themselves from the insurgency. In 1979, the farm owners established ties with the army, and for the first time, a military detachment was stationed on the property, where the first civil patrol in the area was also formed. The army high command was initially pleased with the results of the operation, believing they had succeeded in dismantling most of the social base of the EGP, which had to be expelled from the "Ixil Triangle." At this point, the presence of the EGP in the area significantly diminished due to the army's repressive actions. The army's strategy extended beyond targeting armed combatants; officers were instructed to destroy any towns suspected of collaborating with the EGP and eliminate all sources of resistance. Army units operating in the "Ixil Triangle" were part of the Mariscal Zavala Brigade, based in Guatemala City.

Although the guerrillas did not directly intervene when the army attacked the civilian population—likely due to a lack of supplies and ammunition—they did support survival strategies. For example, they organized "survival plans" that provided evacuation instructions in the event of military incursions. As a result, much of the population began participating in these schemes, finding them their only alternative to military repression.

===== Lucas Garcia presidency =====
The election of Lucas García on 7 March 1978 marked the resumption of counterinsurgency practices reminiscent of the Arana period. This shift was further fueled by the Guatemalan military's reaction to the situation in Nicaragua, where the Sandinista insurgency was on the verge of overthrowing the Somoza regime. To prevent a similar uprising in Guatemala, the government escalated its repressive campaign against the predominantly indigenous mass movement, intensifying and becoming more overt.

On 4 August 1978, high school and university students, along with other popular movement sectors, organized the first major urban protest of the Lucas García era. Intended as a march against violence, the protest attracted an estimated 10,000 participants. Donaldo Alvarez Ruiz, the new minister of the interior under Lucas García, vowed to suppress any unauthorized demonstrations. When the protesters declined to seek permission, they were confronted by the Pelotón Modelo (Model Platoon) of the National Police, equipped with new anti-riot gear provided by the United States Government. The platoon surrounded the marchers and deployed tear gas, forcing students to retreat and resulting in the hospitalization of dozens, mostly adolescents. This incident was followed by additional protests and death squad killings throughout the year. In September 1978, a general strike erupted in response to sharp increases in public transportation fares. The government's harsh response included arrests and injuries, but ultimately led to concessions, such as a public transportation subsidy. Concerned that these concessions might spur further protests, the military government, supported by state-sponsored paramilitary death squads, created an environment of insecurity for public leaders.

In the first half of 1978 alone, the administrator of a large cemetery in Guatemala City reported that over 760 unidentified bodies, presumed victims of death squads, had been interred. Amnesty International described disappearances as an "epidemic" in Guatemala, reporting more than 2,000 killings between mid-1978 and 1980. Between January and November 1979, the Guatemalan press reported 3,252 disappearances.

====== Spanish Embassy fire ======
On 31 January 1980, a group of displaced K'iche' and Ixil peasant farmers occupied the Spanish Embassy in Guatemala City to protest the kidnapping and murder of peasants in Uspantán by elements of the Guatemalan Army. During the subsequent police raid, despite objections from the Spanish ambassador, police attacked the building with incendiary explosives. A fire broke out as the police prevented those inside from escaping, resulting in the deaths of 36 people. The victims' funeral, which included the previously unknown father of Rigoberta Menchú, Vicente Menchú, drew hundreds of thousands of mourners. A new guerrilla group, the Frente Patriótico 31 de Enero (Patriotic Front of 31 January), was formed to commemorate the event. The incident is considered "the defining event" of the Guatemalan Civil War. The Guatemalan government claimed that its forces had entered the embassy at the request of the Spanish Ambassador and that the occupiers, whom they labeled "terrorists," had "sacrificed the hostages and immolated themselves afterward." Ambassador Cajal denied these claims, and Spain immediately severed diplomatic relations with Guatemala, denouncing the action as a violation of "the most elementary norms of international law". Diplomatic relations between Spain and Guatemala were not restored until 22 September 1984.

====== Increased insurgency and state repression: 1980–1982 ======
In the months following the Spanish Embassy fire, the human rights situation in Guatemala continued to deteriorate. The daily number of killings by official and unofficial security forces increased from an average of 20 to 30 in 1979 to a conservative estimate of 30 to 40 daily in 1980. Human rights sources estimated that 5,000 Guatemalans were killed by the government for "political reasons" in 1980 alone, making it the worst human rights violator in the hemisphere after El Salvador. In a report titled Guatemala: A Government Program of Political Murder, Amnesty International stated, "Between January and November of 1980, some 3,000 people described by government representatives as 'subversives' and 'criminals' were either shot on the spot in political assassinations or seized and murdered later; at least 364 others seized in this period have not yet been accounted for."

The government's repression and excessive force against the opposition became a source of contention within Lucas García's administration. This internal conflict led Vice President Francisco Villagrán Kramer to resign on 1 September 1980, citing his disapproval of the government's human rights record as one of his primary reasons. Following his resignation, Kramer went into voluntary exile in the United States, where he took a position in the Legal Department of the Inter-American Development Bank.

====== Insurgent mobilization ======
The effects of state repression further radicalized individuals within the mass movement, leading to increased popular support for the insurgency. By late 1979, the EGP expanded its influence, controlling significant territory in the Ixil Triangle in El Quiché and holding demonstrations in Nebaj, Chajul, and Cotzal. While the EGP expanded in the Altiplano, a new insurgent movement called ORPA (Revolutionary Organization of Armed People) emerged. Composed of local youths and university intellectuals, ORPA evolved from the Regional de Occidente, which had split from the FAR-PGT in 1971. The ORPA's leader, Rodrigo Asturias (son of Nobel Prize-winning author Miguel Ángel Asturias), formed the organization after returning from exile in Mexico. ORPA established its base in the mountains and rainforests above the coffee plantations of southwestern Guatemala and around Lake Atitlán, where it enjoyed considerable popular support. On 18 September 1979, ORPA publicly announced its existence by occupying the Mujulia coffee farm in Quezaltenango province, holding a political education meeting with the workers.

Insurgent movements active during the early phase of the conflict, such as the FAR, also reemerged in 1980, intensifying guerrilla operations in both urban and rural areas. The insurgents carried out armed propaganda acts and assassinated prominent right-wing Guatemalans and landowners, including Enrique Brol, a prominent Ixil landowner, and Alberto Habie, president of CACIF (Coordinating Committee of Agricultural, Commercial, Industrial, and Financial Associations). Encouraged by guerrilla successes elsewhere in Central America, Guatemalan insurgents, especially the EGP, rapidly expanded their influence across diverse geographic areas and ethnic groups, broadening their popular support base. In October 1980, a tripartite alliance was formalized between the EGP, FAR, and ORPA as a precondition for Cuban support.

In early 1981, the insurgents launched the largest offensive in Guatemala's history, followed by another offensive later in the year. Civilians were often coerced into assisting the insurgents, sabotaging roads, army establishments, and anything of strategic value. By 1981, between 250,000 and 500,000 members of Guatemala's indigenous communities actively supported the insurgency, with Army Intelligence (G-2) estimating at least 360,000 indigenous supporters of the EGP alone. From late 1981, the Army implemented a scorched-earth strategy in Quiché, aimed at eliminating the guerrilla's social base. Some communities were forced by the military to relocate to county seats under military control, while others sought refuge in the mountains. Those who fled to the mountains were identified by the Army as guerrilla sympathizers and were subjected to military siege, including continuous attacks that deprived them of food, shelter, and medical care.

====== La Llorona massacre, El Estor ======
La Llorona, located about 18 kilometers from El Estor in the department of Izabal (part of the Northern Transversal Strip), was a small village with no more than twenty houses. Most of the first settlers had arrived from the areas of Senahú and Panzós, both in Alta Verapaz. By 1981, the total population was around 130 people, all of whom belonged to the Q'eqchi' ethnic group. Few villagers spoke Spanish, and most worked in their own cornfields, occasionally working for local landowners. Nearby villages included El Bongo, Socela, Benque, Rio Pita, Santa Maria, Big Plan, and New Hope. Conflicts in the area revolved around land tenure, particularly the uncertainty about boundaries between farms and communities, and the lack of land titles. Since the National Institute of Agrarian Transformation (INTA) had no record of a legitimate owner of the land occupied by La Llorona, the community believed the land belonged to the state and had taken steps to obtain title to the property. However, a powerful local farmer occupied part of the land, leading to a conflict between him and the community. The village men, on their own initiative, devised a new boundary between community land and the farmer's property, but the problem remained unresolved.

In the late 1970s, reports began to surface about the presence of guerrillas in the villages. The guerrilla commander known as Ramón introduced himself to the villagers, identifying his group as the Guerrilla Army of the Poor (EGP). They visited many villages, inquiring about local issues and offering to resolve them. The guerrillas told the peasants that the land belonged to the poor and encouraged them to trust the movement. In 1977, Ramón regularly visited La Llorona, and after discovering that land disputes were causing significant problems in the community, he taught the villagers new surveying techniques, which alarmed local landowners. That same year, Ramón's group arbitrarily executed Spanish landowner José Hernández near his property, El Recreo. In response, a clandestine group of mercenaries, dubbed the "Fighters of the Rich," was formed to protect the interests of the landlords. The local authorities in El Estor organized and funded the group, which was supported by the region's major landowners. This irregular group was connected to military commissioners and army commanders in the region, though internal rivalries also existed. The secret organization murdered several people, including victims who had no connection to insurgent groups.

In December 1978, Ramón, the leader of the EGP group, was captured by soldiers from the military detachment in El Estor and transferred to the military zone in Puerto Barrios. After two years, he returned to El Estor, this time as an officer in Army Intelligence (G-2), joining a group of soldiers who came to the village.

====== Killings ======
On the evening of 28 September 1981, an army officer, accompanied by four soldiers and a military commissioner, met with about thirty civilians. At seven o'clock, over thirty civilians, mostly from "Nueva Esperanza," including several 'informants' connected to military intelligence, gathered near La Llorona. Along with some military commissioners, a small group of soldiers and army officers, they entered the village. Civilians and commissioners went into twelve houses, dragging out the men and shooting them dead outside their homes. Those who tried to escape were also killed. Women who attempted to protect their husbands were beaten. While the military commissioners and civilians executed the men, the soldiers looted the victims' belongings. Within half an hour, the perpetrators of the assault left the village.

Aftermath

The bodies of the victims, fourteen in all, lay in front of their houses. Despite being threatened with death if they revealed what had happened, the women ran to the nearest village, El Bongo, seeking help. After a few hours, they returned with people who helped bury the bodies. Days later, the widows, along with nearly 60 fatherless children, were taken in by the parish of El Estor for several days until soldiers forced them to return to their village. Two widows of those executed on 29 September developed close relations with the military commissioners from Bongo, causing divisions that persist in the community.

Economic and social life in the village was severely disrupted. The widows had to take on their husbands' work, but due to their inexperience in farming, they harvested very little corn and beans. Diseases, especially among children and the elderly, spread as there was a lack of food and clothing. The village teacher, who only worked part-time out of fear, eventually left when he realized it was no longer worthwhile, as young people had to work and could not afford to travel. The village remained without a teacher for the next four years. The events ultimately fractured the community. Some village women believed their husbands were killed due to the involvement of three individuals, connected to the guerrillas, who were involved in a land dispute.

According to the Historical Clarification Commission, the landowner involved in the dispute took advantage of the situation to appropriate an additional 5 hectares (12 acres) of land.

===== List of other massacres perpetrated by the Army in the Franja Transversal del Norte =====
The report of the Recovery of Historical Memory lists 422 massacres committed by both sides in the conflict; however, it also states that they did the best they could in terms of obtaining information and therefore the list is incomplete; therefore here are the cases that have also been documented in other reports as well.

Chajul, Nebaj and Ixcán massacres in Franja Transversal del Norte
#	Location	Department	Date	Root cause
1	Ilom (village), Chajul	Quiché	23 March 1982	After 1981, repression in Ilom intensified, culminating in the massacre of 96 alleged guerrilla members in front of their families on 23 March 1982, as part of the Army's "Victoria 82" plan. The soldiers involved were from the military base in "La Perla". Survivors fled and sought refuge in the *Comunidades de Población en Resistencia* (Resistance Population Communities).
2	Chel (village), Chajul	Quiché	3 April 1982	As part of Operation "Victoria 82," Army soldiers from the military base in "La Perla" stormed the settlement of Chel, having marked it as "subversive." The assault resulted in the deaths of 95 civilians.
3	Chisis (village), San Juan Cotzal	Quiché	13 February 1982	Chisís was a military target for the Army, which considered the village symbolic of the EGP and believed it to be the guerrilla headquarters where attacks on Chajul, Cotzal, and Nebaj had been planned. In January 1982, the EGP attacked the Cotzal military base, with the assault lasting 2 hours and 20 minutes, resulting in 100 military casualties and 20 guerrilla casualties. In retaliation, PAC and Army battalions completely destroyed Chisís, leaving approximately 200 dead civilians.
4	Acul (village), Nebaj	Quiché	April 1982	Combat against the EGP resulted in 17 deaths.

===== List of massacres perpetrated by the EGP in FTN =====
According to a report by the rightist magazine Crónica, there were 1,258 guerrilla actions against civilians and infrastructure in Guatemala, including more than 200 murders, 68 kidnappings, 11 bombings of embassies, and 329 attacks on civilians. Most guerrilla massacres occurred in 1982, during a period of intensified militarization and widespread PAC presence in communities. Many victims were targeted for non-cooperation with the guerrillas, and some attacks followed prior PAC assaults. Guerrilla massacres did not typically involve informants, population concentration, or group separation, and there are no reports of rape or repeated slaughter. Instances of razed villages were recorded, though mass flight was less common, despite some occurrences. The use of lists was more frequent.

In a publication by the Army of Guatemala, it was reported that the EGP was responsible for sixty massacres, which were largely overlooked by REHMI and the Historical Clarification Commission reports. Additionally, it was reported that in mid-1982, 32 members of the "Star Guerrilla Front" were executed for failing to raise the EGP flag.

Chajul, Nebaj and Ixcán massacres in Franja Transversal del Norte
#	Location	Department	Date	Description
1	Calapté, Uspantán	Quiché	17 February 1982	There were 42 fatalities, all of whom were murdered with machetes.
2	Salacuín	Alta Verapaz	May 1982	The EGP entered the community and murdered 20 peasants.
3	El Conguito (settlement), Las Pacayas (village), San Cristóbal Verapaz	Alta Verapaz	1981	
4	Sanimtakaj (village), San Cristóbal Verapaz	Alta Verapaz	1980	
5	San Miguel Sechochoch (farm), Chisec	Alta Verapaz	March 1982	
6	Chacalté, Chajul	Quiché	June 1982	Attack against a "reactionary gang" (Note: Comisión para el Esclarecimiento Histórico: Caso No. 110 (1999), Memoria del silencio, "EGP classified the PAC according to the collaboration level they gave to the Army. The guerrilla differentiated patrols formed by people eager to help the Army -and called them "reactionary gangs"- from those "forced civilian patrols" that were forcibly participating.") from the PAC in Chacalté, which had recently formed in March and was loyal to the Army after becoming disillusioned with guerrilla promises. The attack resulted in 55 civilian deaths.
7	San Miguel Acatán (town), San Miguel Acatán	Huehuetenango	Unknown	
8	Santa Cruz del Quiche (city), Santa Cruz del Quiché	Quiché	July 1982	
9	Chuacaman (settlement), El Carmen Chitatul (village), Santa Cruz del Quiché	Quiché	December 1982	
10	La Estancia (village), Santa Cruz del Quiché	Quiché	August 1981	
11	Xesic (village), Santa Cruz del Quiché	Quiché	1981	
12	Patzité (town)	Quiché	September 1981	
13	Lancetillo (village), Uspantán	Quiché	September 1982	
14	La Taña (village), Uspantán	Quiché	March 1982	
15	Tzununul (village), Sacapulas	Quiché	February 1982	
16	Salinas Magdalena (village), Sacapulas	Quiché	August 1982	
17	Rosario Monte María (village), Chicamán	Quiché	October 1982	

===== Civil war in Guatemala city =====
Beheaded corpses hanging from their legs in between what is left from blown up cars, shapeless bodies among glass shards and tree branches all over the place is what a terrorist attack caused yesterday at 9:35 am. El Gráfico reporters were able to get to exact place where the bomb went off, only seconds after the horrific explosion, and found a truly infernal scene in the corner of the 6th avenue and 6th street -where the Presidential Office is located- which had turned into a huge oven -but the solid building where the president worked was safe-. The reporters witnessed the dramatic rescue of the wounded, some of them critical, like the man that completely lost a leg and had only stripes of skin instead.

El Gráfico, 6 September 1980

On 31 January 1980, Guatemala gained worldwide attention when the Spanish Embassy in Guatemala City was burned down, resulting in 37 deaths, including embassy personnel and high-ranking Guatemalan former government officials. A group of indigenous people from El Quiché occupied the embassy in a desperate attempt to draw attention to their issues with the Army in that region, which was rich in oil and had been recently populated as part of the "Franja Transversal del Norte" agricultural program. The fire, which started when the police attempted to retake the building, resulted in the deaths of 37 people. Following this incident, Spain severed its diplomatic relations with Guatemala.

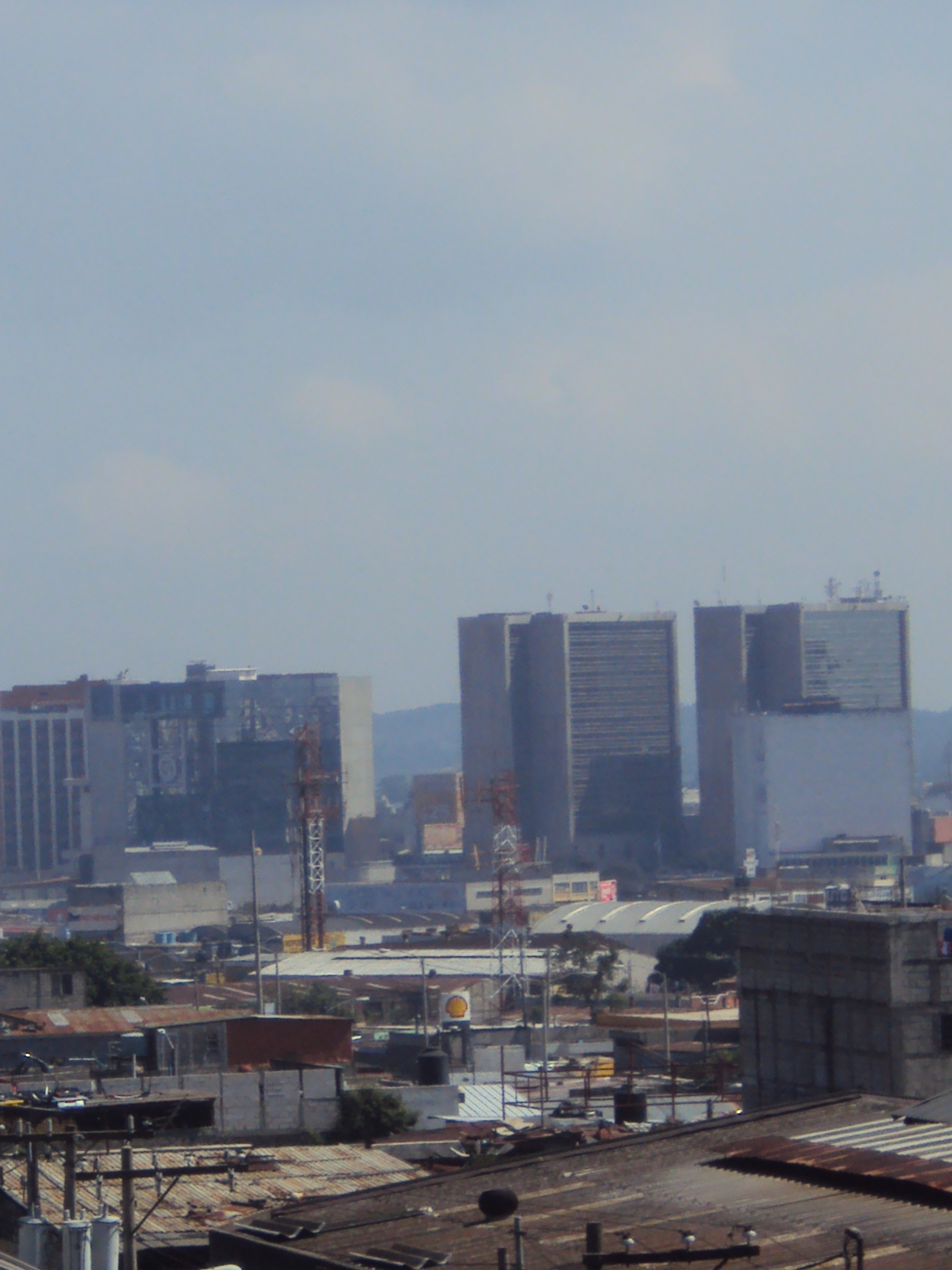
Finance Center in 2011. In 1981, a powerful bomb exploded in the building's basement, leaving it without windows for several years. The owners, Industrial Bank, decided to keep the building open to the public as a defiant stance against the leftist guerrilla.

On 5 September 1980, a terrorist attack by the Ejército Guerrillero de los Pobres (EGP) occurred in front of the Guatemalan National Palace, which was then the headquarters of the Guatemalan government. The attack aimed to disrupt a major demonstration planned by General Lucas García's government for 7 September 1980. The incident resulted in the deaths of six adults and one child when two bombs exploded inside a vehicle.

The attack caused an undetermined number of injuries and significant material damage, affecting not only the art pieces in the National Palace but also surrounding buildings, particularly the Lucky Building, located directly across from the Presidential Office. Among the deceased were Domingo Sánchez, the Secretary of Agriculture's driver; Joaquín Díaz y Díaz, a car washer; and Amílcar de Paz, a security guard.

Attacks on private financial, commercial, and agricultural targets increased during Lucas García's presidency, as leftist Marxist groups perceived these institutions as "reactionary" and "millionaire exploiters" collaborating with the repressive government. The following is a non-exhaustive list of terrorist attacks that occurred in Guatemala City and are detailed in the UN Commission report:

Date	Perpetrator	Target	Result
15 September 1981	Rebel Army Forces	Corporación Financiera Nacional (CORFINA)	A car bomb damaged the building along with neighboring Guatemalan and international financial institutions, causing more than Q300,000 in losses.
19 October 1981	EGP Urban guerrilla	Industrial Bank Financial Center	Sabotage of the building.
21 December 1981	EGP "Otto René Castillo" commando	Chamber of Industry, Torre Panamericana (Bank of Coffee headquarters) and Industrial Bank Financial Center	The car bombs completely shattered the building's windows.
28 December de 1981	EGP "Otto René Castillo" commando	Industrial Bank Financial Center	A car bomb targeted the building, virtually destroying one of the bank's towers. In a show of defiance, the bank chose not to repair the windows immediately and continued operations as normally as possible.

Despite the insurgency's advances, it made several fatal strategic errors. Successes by revolutionary forces in Nicaragua against the Somoza regime, combined with the insurgency's own achievements against the Lucas government, led rebel leaders to mistakenly believe that they were reaching a military equilibrium in Guatemala. As a result, the insurgency underestimated the government's military strength. Consequently, the insurgents were overwhelmed and unable to secure their gains or protect the indigenous civilian population from reprisals by the security forces.

===== 'Operation Ceniza' =====
In response to the guerrilla offensive in early 1981, the Guatemalan Army initiated a large-scale rural counter-offensive. The Lucas government instituted a policy of forced recruitment and began organizing a "task-force" model for fighting the insurgency, whereby strategic mobile forces were drawn from larger military brigades. To reduce civilian participation in the insurgency and distinguish "hostile" from compliant communities, the army resorted to "civic action" measures. Under Chief of Staff Benedicto Lucas García (the President's brother), the army began recruiting civilians into pro-government paramilitary patrols to combat insurgents and eliminate their collaborators.

In 1980 and 1981, the United States, under the Reagan administration, delivered $10.5 million worth of Bell 212 and Bell 412 helicopters and $3.2 million worth of military trucks and jeeps to the Guatemalan Army. In 1981, the Reagan administration also approved a $2 million covert CIA program for Guatemala.

On 15 April 1981, EGP rebels attacked a Guatemalan Army patrol near the village of Cocob, close to Nebaj, killing five personnel. On 17 April 1981, a reinforced company of airborne troops was deployed to the village, where they encountered guerrillas, foxholes, and a hostile population appearing to fully support the insurgents. "The soldiers were forced to fire at anything that moved". The army killed 65 civilians, including 34 children, five adolescents, 23 adults, and two elderly individuals.

In July 1981, the armed forces began a new phase of counterinsurgency operations under the code-name Operación Ceniza (Operation Ashes), lasting through March 1982. The goal was to "separate and isolate the insurgents from the civilian population.". During Operación Ceniza, around 15,000 troops were gradually deployed through the predominantly indigenous Altiplano region, covering the departments of El Quiché and Huehuetenango.

The Guatemalan military's counterinsurgency efforts resulted in widespread civilian casualties and displacement. To sever the insurgents' ties with the civilian population, the army executed mass killings, burned villages and crops, and slaughtered livestock, depriving survivors of their livelihoods. The human rights office of the Catholic Church estimated that 11,000 people, mostly indigenous peasants from the highlands, died in 1981 alone. Other sources put the death toll from government repression that year between 9,000 and 13,500.

As repression intensified, tensions between the Guatemalan military and the Lucas García regime grew. Military professionals viewed the Lucas government's heavy-handed approach as counterproductive, arguing that its reliance on military force and systematic terror failed to address the social and ideological roots of the insurgency while further radicalizing the civilian population. Tensions escalated when Lucas endorsed his defense minister, Angel Aníbal Guevara, as the candidate for the March 1982 presidential elections, going against military interests.

In 1982, the guerrilla organizations merged to form the Guatemalan National Revolutionary Unity (URNG). Concurrently, extreme right-wing vigilante groups such as the Secret Anti-Communist Army (ESA) and the White Hand (La Mano Blanca) were actively torturing and murdering students, professionals, and peasants suspected of leftist involvement.

On 23 March 1982, junior army officers staged a coup d'état to block General Ángel Aníbal Guevara from assuming power, denouncing his election win as fraudulent. Guevara had been selected by outgoing President General Romeo Lucas García. The coup leaders invited retired General Efraín Ríos Montt to negotiate Lucas' departure. Ríos Montt, a former presidential candidate for the Guatemalan Christian Democracy party in 1974, was believed to have lost due to electoral fraud. By 1982, he had become a lay pastor in the evangelical Protestant Church of the Word. In his inaugural address, he claimed his presidency was ordained by God, and he was seen as enjoying strong backing from the Reagan administration.

Ríos Montt established a three-member military junta that annulled the 1965 constitution, dissolved Congress, suspended political parties, and canceled the electoral law. After a few months, Montt dismissed the other junta members and assumed the title of "President of the Republic".

Guerrilla forces and their leftist allies condemned Montt, who sought to defeat them through a mix of military actions and economic reforms, summarized by his slogan, "rifles and beans". In May 1982, the Conference of Catholic Bishops held Montt responsible for increased militarization and continued military massacres. On 18 July 1982, an army officer reportedly told an indigenous audience in Cunén: "If you are with us, we'll feed you; if not, we'll kill you". On the same day, the Plan de Sánchez massacre took place.

The government also began organizing civilian defense patrols (PACs). Though participation was supposedly voluntary, many rural men, including boys and the elderly, were forced to join or be branded as guerrillas. At its peak, the PACs are estimated to have included 1 million conscripts. Montt's conscript army and the PACs recaptured almost all guerrilla-controlled areas. Guerrilla activity diminished, becoming mostly limited to hit-and-run attacks, though this partial victory came at a tremendous cost in civilian lives.

Montt's brief presidency was likely the most violent period of the 36-year internal conflict, which resulted in the deaths of thousands of unarmed indigenous civilians. While leftist guerrillas and right-wing death squads also carried out summary executions, forced disappearances, and torture of noncombatants, the vast majority of human rights violations were committed by the Guatemalan military and the PACs under their control. The internal conflict is extensively detailed in the reports of the Historical Clarification Commission (CEH) and the Archbishop's Office for Human Rights (ODHAG). The CEH estimated that government forces were responsible for 93% of the violations, while ODHAG had previously estimated 80%.

On 8 August 1983, Montt was overthrown by his Minister of Defense, General Óscar Humberto Mejía Víctores, who then assumed power as the de facto president of Guatemala. Mejía justified the coup by citing issues with "religious fanatics" in the government and "official corruption." Seven people were killed during the coup. Montt survived and later founded a political party, the Guatemalan Republic Front, eventually becoming President of Congress in 1995 and again in 2000.

Awareness in the United States about the Guatemalan conflict, particularly its ethnic aspects, increased with the 1983 publication of the testimonial I, Rigoberta Menchú, a memoir by a prominent activist. Rigoberta Menchú was awarded the 1992 Nobel Peace Prize for her advocacy of broader social justice. In 1998, a book by U.S. anthropologist David Stoll questioned some details of Menchú's account, sparking international debate. The Nobel Committee, however, maintained that the prize was awarded based on Menchú's undisputed work in promoting human rights and the peace process.

General Mejía facilitated a controlled return to democracy in Guatemala, beginning with a 1 July 1984 election for a Constituent Assembly to draft a new constitution. After nine months of deliberation, the assembly completed the draft on 30 May 1985, and the new Constitution of Guatemala took immediate effect. In the first election held under the new constitution, Vinicio Cerezo, the Christian Democracy Party's candidate, won with nearly 70% of the vote and assumed office on 14 January 1986.

==== 1986 to 1996: From Constitution to Peace Accords ====
Upon its inauguration in January 1986, President Cerezo's civilian government prioritized ending political violence and establishing the rule of law. Reforms included new laws on habeas corpus and amparo (court-ordered protection), the creation of a legislative human rights committee, and the establishment of the Office of Human Rights Ombudsman in 1987. The Supreme Court also initiated reforms to combat corruption and enhance the efficiency of the legal system.

With Cerezo's election, the military returned to its traditional role of internal security, focusing on combating armed insurgents. The first two years of Cerezo's administration saw a stable economy and a significant reduction in political violence. However, military dissatisfaction led to two coup attempts in May 1988 and May 1989, though the military leadership supported the constitutional order. The government faced strong criticism for its failure to investigate or prosecute cases of human rights violations.

The latter part of Cerezo's presidency was marked by a deteriorating economy, strikes, protest marches, and widespread allegations of corruption. The government's inability to address social and health issues—such as infant mortality, illiteracy, inadequate health and social services, and rising violence—fueled public discontent.

Presidential and congressional elections were held on 11 November 1990. After a runoff, Jorge Antonio Serrano Elías was inaugurated on 14 January 1991, marking the first successful transition from one democratically elected civilian government to another. With his Movement of Solidarity Action (MAS) Party holding only 18 of 116 seats in Congress, Serrano formed a fragile coalition with the Christian Democrats and the National Union of the Center (UCN) to govern.

The Serrano administration's record was mixed. It achieved some success in consolidating civilian control over the army, replacing several senior officers and encouraging the military to engage in peace talks with the URNG. Serrano also took the politically unpopular step of recognizing the sovereignty of Belize, which Guatemala had long claimed as a province. Additionally, his government reversed the economic decline it inherited, reducing inflation and stimulating real growth.

In 1992, Efraín Bámaca, a prominent guerrilla leader known as Comandante Everardo, was "disappeared". It was later revealed that Bámaca had been tortured and killed that year by Guatemalan Army officers. His widow, American Jennifer Harbury, along with the Guatemala Human Rights Commission in Washington, D.C., protested, leading the United States to declassify documents dating back to 1954 regarding its actions in Guatemala. It was discovered that the CIA had been funding the military, despite Congress prohibiting such funding since 1990 due to the Army's human rights abuses. Congress compelled the CIA to cease its aid to the Guatemalan Army.

On 25 May 1993, Serrano unlawfully dissolved Congress and the Supreme Court, and attempted to restrict civil freedoms under the guise of combating corruption. This autogolpe (palace coup) failed due to widespread protests from Guatemalan society, international pressure, and the army's enforcement of the Constitutional Court's ruling against the takeover. Confronted with this opposition, Serrano fled the country.

On 5 June 1993, Congress, in accordance with the 1985 constitution, elected Ramiro de León Carpio, the Human Rights Ombudsman, to complete Serrano's presidential term. De León, who was not affiliated with any political party, lacked a political base but garnered strong popular support. He launched an ambitious anti-corruption campaign to "purify" Congress and the Supreme Court, calling for the resignation of all members of both bodies.

Despite significant resistance from Congress, pressure from the presidency and the public led to a November 1993 agreement brokered by the Catholic Church between the administration and Congress. This package of constitutional reforms was approved by popular referendum on 30 January 1994. In August 1994, a new Congress was elected to complete the unexpired term. Controlled by anti-corruption parties—the populist Guatemalan Republican Front (FRG) led by Ríos Montt, and the center-right National Advancement Party (PAN)—the new Congress began to distance itself from the corruption that plagued its predecessors.

Under de León, the peace process, now facilitated by the United Nations, gained new momentum. The government and the URNG signed agreements on human rights (March 1994), resettlement of displaced persons (June 1994), historical clarification (June 1994), and indigenous rights (March 1995). They also made significant progress on a socioeconomic and agrarian agreement.

National elections for president, Congress, and municipal offices were held in November 1995. With nearly 20 parties competing in the first round, the presidential election went to a runoff on 7 January 1996, where PAN candidate Álvaro Arzú Irigoyen defeated Alfonso Portillo Cabrera of the FRG by just over 2% of the vote. Arzú won due to his strong support in Guatemala City, where he had previously served as mayor, and the surrounding urban areas. Portillo secured victories in all rural departments except Petén. Under the Arzú administration, peace negotiations were concluded, and the government signed peace accords in December 1996, ending the 36-year internal conflict (see section on the peace process).

==== 1996 Peace Accords to Present ====
The human rights situation remained challenging during Arzú's tenure, although initial steps were taken to reduce the military's influence in national affairs. The most notable human rights case of this period was the brutal slaying of Bishop Juan José Gerardi on 24 April 1998, two days after he publicly presented a major Catholic Church-sponsored human rights report known as Guatemala: Nunca Más, summarising testimony about human rights abuses during the Civil War. It was prepared by the Recovery of Historical Memory project, known by the acronym REMHI. In 2001, three Army officers were convicted in civil court and sentenced to lengthy prison terms for his murder.

Guatemala held presidential, legislative, and municipal elections on 7 November 1999, followed by a runoff presidential election on 26 December. Alfonso Portillo faced criticism during the campaign for his ties to the FRG's chairman, former president Ríos Montt, who was accused of committing some of the worst human rights violations during his rule.

In the first round, the Guatemalan Republican Front (FRG) won 63 of 113 legislative seats, while the National Advancement Party (PAN) secured 37. The New Nation Alliance (ANN) won nine seats, and three minority parties won the remaining four. In the runoff on 26 December, Alfonso Portillo (FRG) won 68% of the vote, compared to 32% for Óscar Berger (PAN). Portillo carried all 22 departments and Guatemala City, which was considered PAN's stronghold.

Portillo's decisive electoral victory gave him a strong mandate to implement his reform program. He pledged to maintain strong ties with the United States, enhance Guatemala's cooperation with Mexico, and participate in the integration process in Central America and the Western Hemisphere. Domestically, he promised to support continued economic liberalisation, increase investment in human capital and infrastructure, establish an independent central bank, and boost revenue through stricter tax enforcement rather than increasing taxation.

Portillo also committed to continuing the peace process, appointing a civilian defense minister, reforming the armed forces, replacing the military presidential security service with a civilian one, and strengthening the protection of human rights. He appointed a diverse cabinet, including indigenous members and individuals independent of the FRG ruling party.

Progress in implementing Portillo's reform agenda during his first year in office was slow. Consequently, public support for the government fell to near-record lows by early 2001. While the administration made some progress in taking state responsibility for past human rights cases and supporting human rights in international forums, it struggled with prosecuting past human rights cases and achieving military reforms or a fiscal pact to finance peace implementation programs. Additionally, it sought legislation to increase political participation among residents. The prosecution of suspects in Bishop Gerardi's murder set a precedent in 2001, marking the first time military officers in Guatemala were tried in civil courts.

Confronted with a high crime rate, public corruption, and frequent harassment and intimidation of human rights activists, judicial workers, journalists, and witnesses in human rights trials, the government began serious attempts in 2001 to open a national dialogue to address the country's substantial challenges.

In July 2003, the Jueves Negro demonstrations rocked the capital, leading to the closure of the US embassy and the UN mission. Supporters of Ríos Montt called for his return to power and demanded that the courts lift a ban on former coup leaders participating in government. They wanted Montt to run as a presidential candidate in the 2003 elections, and the FRG supported the demonstrators.

On 9 November 2003, Óscar Berger, a former mayor of Guatemala City, won the presidential election with 39% of the vote. Failing to achieve a majority, he proceeded to a runoff election on 28 December, which he also won. He defeated center-left candidate Álvaro Colom, while Montt, allowed to run, trailed in a distant third with 11% of the vote.

In early October 2005, Guatemala was devastated by Hurricane Stan. Although a relatively weak storm, it triggered severe flooding, resulting in at least 1,500 deaths and thousands of people left homeless.

Determined to address crime and internal police corruption, Óscar Berger reached an agreement with the United Nations in December 2006 to support judicial enforcement. They established the International Commission against Impunity in Guatemala (CICIG), an independent institution designed to assist the Office of the Prosecutor of Guatemala, the National Police Force, and other investigative bodies. CICIG's goal was to prosecute cells linked to organised crime and drug trafficking. It has the authority to conduct its own inquiries and refer significant cases to the national judiciary, aiming to "reinforce the national criminal justice system and support its reforms."

As of 2010, CICIG has led inquiries into approximately 20 cases and is acting as Deputy Prosecutor in eight others. CICIG conducted investigations that led to an arrest warrant for Erwin Sperisen, former Head of the National Civilian Police (Policía Nacional Civil – PNC) from 2004 to 2007. With dual Swiss-Guatemalan citizenship, Sperisen fled to Switzerland to avoid prosecution in Guatemala for numerous extrajudicial killings and police corruption. Additionally, 17 other individuals, including several former high-ranking political figures from Guatemala, are covered by arrest warrants related to these crimes.

===== Otto Pérez Molina government and "La Línea" case =====
Retired General Otto Pérez Molina was elected president alongside Roxana Baldetti, Guatemala's first female vice president, and they began their term on 14 January 2012. However, on 16 April 2015, the UN anti-corruption agency CICIG issued a report implicating several high-profile politicians, including Vice President Baldetti's private secretary, Juan Carlos Monzón, and the director of the Guatemalan Internal Revenue Service. The revelations generated public outrage reminiscent of the period during General Kjell Eugenio Laugerud Garcia's presidency. The CICIG, working with the Guatemalan attorney general, exposed the "La Línea" scam, which involved officials accepting bribes from importers in exchange for reducing tariffs. This practice was rooted in a long tradition of customs corruption in the country, dating back to successive military governments that sought to fund counterinsurgency operations during Guatemala's 36-year civil war.

Citizens organized a Facebook event inviting people to gather in Guatemala City to demand Vice President Baldetti's resignation, using the hashtag #RenunciaYa (Resign Now). Within days, over 10,000 people pledged to attend. The organizers emphasized that the event was non-political and instructed protesters to follow the law, avoid covering their faces or wearing party colors, and bring essentials like water, food, and sunblock. Tens of thousands took to the streets, leading to Baldetti's resignation a few days later. She was forced to remain in Guatemala after the United States revoked her visa, and the Guatemalan government investigated her for involvement in the "La Línea" scandal. The prominent role of US Ambassador Todd Robinson in the investigation fueled suspicions among Guatemalans that the US government sought to replace the Guatemalan administration with one more sympathetic to its interests, particularly to counter China and Russia's influence in the region.

Since then, the UN anti-corruption committee has reported on additional cases, leading to the resignation or arrest of over 20 government officials. Among the most significant cases are those involving two former presidential private secretaries: Juan de Dios Rodríguez, from the Guatemalan Social Service, and Gustavo Martínez, who was implicated in a bribery scandal involving the Jaguar Energy power plant. Martínez was also the son-in-law of President Pérez Molina.

Political opposition leaders have also been implicated in CICIG investigations. Several legislators and members of the Libertad Democrática Renovada (LIDER) party were formally accused of bribery, leading to a sharp decline in support for its presidential candidate, Manuel Baldizón. Before April, Baldizón had been the frontrunner in the 6 September 2015 presidential election. However, his popularity plummeted, and he even accused CICIG leader Iván Velásquez of international interference in Guatemalan affairs before the Organization of American States.

CICIG presented so many cases on Thursdays that Guatemalans began referring to them as "CICIG's Thursdays." However, it was a Friday press conference that escalated the crisis to its peak: on Friday, 21 August 2015, CICIG and Attorney General Thelma Aldana presented evidence suggesting that both President Pérez Molina and former Vice President Baldetti were the actual leaders of "La Línea." Baldetti was arrested that same day, and an impeachment request was made for the president. In response, several cabinet members resigned, and public calls for the president's resignation reached unprecedented levels after Pérez Molina defiantly announced in a televised message on 23 August 2015 that he would not step down.

After thousands of protesters took to the streets to demand the increasingly isolated president's resignation, Guatemala's Congress appointed a commission of five legislators to consider removing the president's immunity from prosecution, a request that was approved by the Supreme Court. A major day of action began on Thursday, 27 August, with marches and roadblocks across the country. Urban groups, which had been leading regular protests since the scandal broke in April, sought to unite with rural and indigenous organizations that were orchestrating roadblocks.

The strike in Guatemala City drew a large, peaceful crowd that included a diverse range of participants, from the indigenous poor to wealthy elites, as well as students from public and private universities. Hundreds of schools and businesses closed in support of the protests. An organization representing Guatemala's most powerful business leaders issued a statement demanding Pérez Molina's resignation and urged Congress to strip him of immunity.

The Attorney General's Office also released a statement urging the president to resign "to prevent ungovernability that could destabilize the nation." As the pressure mounted, two of the president's former ministers of defense and the interior, who were implicated in the corruption investigation and had recently resigned from the cabinet, left the country. Meanwhile, Pérez Molina continued to lose support daily. The powerful private sector – which had been a loyal supporter of Molina, their former defender in the Army during the Guatemalan Civil War – called for his resignation. However, he managed to garner support from entrepreneurs outside the private sector chambers, such as Mario López Estrada, the billionaire owner of cellular phone companies and the grandson of former dictator Manuel Estrada Cabrera, whose executives took over the vacated cabinet positions.

The Guatemalan radio station TGTO ("Emisoras Unidas") reported a text message exchange with Pérez Molina, who, when asked whether he planned to resign, responded, "I will face whatever is necessary to face, and what the law requires." Some protesters demanded that the general election be postponed, citing both the ongoing crisis and accusations of irregularities. Others warned that suspending the vote could lead to an institutional vacuum. However, on 2 September 2015, Molina resigned from office after Congress impeached him the day before. On 3 September 2015, he was summoned to the Justice Department to face his first legal hearing for the La Línea case.

===== Tenures of Jimmy Morales and Alejandro Giammattei (2016–2024) =====
In October 2015, following massive anti-corruption demonstrations, former TV comedian Jimmy Morales was elected as the new President of Guatemala in the 2015 Guatemalan general election. He took office in January 2016.

In January 2017, President Morales announced that Guatemala would move its embassy in Israel to Jerusalem, becoming the first nation to follow the United States.

In January 2020, Alejandro Giammattei replaced Jimmy Morales as President of Guatemala after winning the 2019 Guatemalan general election in August 2019, running on a "tough-on-crime" platform.

In November 2020, large protests and demonstrations erupted across Guatemala against President Alejandro Giammattei and the legislature, sparked by cuts to education and health spending.

==== Tenure of Bernardo Arévalo (2024 onwards ) ====
In August 2023, Bernardo Arévalo, the candidate of the centre-left Semilla Movement and son of former president Juan José Arévalo, achieved a landslide victory in Guatemala's presidential election. On 14 January 2024, Bernardo Arévalo was sworn in as Guatemala's president.

== See also ==
- List of presidents of Guatemala
- Politics of Guatemala
- Route of the Agroindustry and the Architecture Victoriana of Guatemala
- Route of the Dominican Evangelisation of Guatemala
- Route of the Franciscan Evangelisation in Guatemala
- Spanish colonization of the Americas
- Timeline of Guatemala City

== Notes and references ==
=== Bibliography ===
- Aguilera Peralta, Gabriel; Romero Imery, Jorge; et al. (1981). Dialéctica del terror en Guatemala (in Spanish). San José: EDUCA.
- Albizures, Arturo; Hernández, Boris (2013). "Morir para ganar la vida". Noticias Comunicarte, Asociación guatemalteca para la comunicación del arte y cultura (in Spanish). Archived from the original on 15 August 2014.
- Arce, Manuel José (1830). Memoria de la conducta pública y administrativa de Manuel José Arce, durante el periodo de su presidencia : escrita en defensa de las calumnias que contra su persona han vertido los mismos que se rebelaron contra el gobierno y la nación de Centro-América (in Spanish). México: Imprenta de Galván á cargo de Mariano Arévalo. OCLC 054265435.
- Adas, M.; Stearns; Schwarz, S.B. (2009). Turbulent Passage: A Global History of the Twentieth Century (4th ed.). Upper Saddle River, New Jersey: Pearson Education. ISBN 978-0205700325.
- Aguirre, Lily (1949). The land of eternal spring: Guatemala, my beautiful country. Patio Press. p. 253.
- Arévalo Martinez, Rafael (1945). ¡Ecce Pericles! (in Spanish). Guatemala: Tipografía Nacional.
- Aycinena, Pedro de (1854). Concordato entre la Santa Sede y el presidente de la República de Guatemala (in Latin and Spanish). Guatemala: Imprenta La Paz.
- Baily, John (1850). Central America; Describing Each of the States of Guatemala, Honduras, Salvador, Nicaragua, and Costa Rica. London: Trelawney Saunders. p. 55.
- Banco de Guatemala (29 December 1996). "Ilustraciones de Cada una de las 11 Denominaciones. Anverso y Reverso". Banguat.gob.gt (in Spanish). Archived from the original on 7 June 2007.
- Barrientos, Alfonso Enrique (1948). "Ramón Rosa y Guatemala" (PDF). Revista del archivo y biblioteca nacionales (in Spanish). 27 (3–4). Honduras. Archived from the original (PDF) on 19 December 2014.
- Benz, Stephen Connely (1996). Guatemalan Journey. University of Texas Press. ISBN 9780292708402.
- Blakeley, Ruth (2009). State Terrorism and Neoliberalism: The North in the South. Routledge. ISBN 978-0415686174.
- Calvert, Peter (1985). Guatemala: A Nation in Turmoil. Boulder, Colorado: Westview Press. ISBN 978-0865315723.
- Campbell, Lyle (1997). American Indian languages: The historical linguistics of Native America. New York: Oxford University Press. ISBN 0-19-509427-1.
- Castellanos Cambranes, J. (1992). Tendencias del desarrollo agrario, en 500 años de lucha por la tierra (in Spanish). Vol. 1. Guatemala: FLACSO.
- Castellanos, Lorena (2014). "Vida y obra de José María Reyna Barrios". Universidad Francisco Marroquín (in Spanish). Guatemala.
- CEUR (2009). "En pie de lucha: Organización y represión en la Universidad de San Carlos, Guatemala 1944 a 1996". Centro de Estudios Urbanos y Regionales, Universidad de San Carlos (in Spanish). Archived from the original on 11 March 2009.
- Chapman, Peter (2007). Bananas: How the United Fruit Company Shaped the World. NY: Canongate.
- Compagnie Belge de Colonisation (1844). Colonisation du district de Santo-Thomas de Guatemala par la Communauté de l'Union. Collection de renseignements publiés ou recueillis par la Compagnie (in French). Original held and digitised by the British Library.
- Comisión para el Esclarecimiento Histórico: Caso No. 44 (1999). "Caso ilustrativo No. 44". Guatemala: Memoria del Silencio (in Spanish). Archived from the original (online edition) on 6 May 2013.
- Comisión para el Esclarecimiento Histórico: Caso No. 59 (1999). "Caso ilustrativo No. 59". Guatemala: Memoria del Silencio (in Spanish). Archived from the original (online edition) on 6 May 2013.
- — (1999). "Caso ilustrativo No. 61". Guatemala: Memoria del Silencio (in Spanish). Archived from the original (online edition) on 6 May 2013.
- Comisión para el Esclarecimiento Histórico: Caso No. 77 (1999). "Caso ilustrativo No. 77". Guatemala: Memoria del Silencio (in Spanish). Archived from the original (online edition) on 6 May 2013.
- — (1999). "Caso ilustrativo No. 92". Guatemala: Memoria del Silencio (in Spanish). Archived from the original (online edition) on 6 May 2013.
- Comisión para el Esclarecimiento Histórico: Caso No. 107 (1999). "Caso ilustrativo No. 107". Guatemala: Memoria del Silencio (in Spanish). Archived from the original (online edition) on 6 May 2013.
- Comisión para el Esclarecimiento Histórico: Agudización (1999). "Agudización de la Violencia y Militarización del Estado (1979–1985)". Guatemala: Memoria del Silencio (in Spanish). Archived from the original on 6 May 2013.
- Comisión para el Esclarecimiento Histórico: Vol. IV (1999). "Atentados contra sedes municipales". Guatemala: Memoria del Silencio (in Spanish). Programa de Ciencia y Derechos Humanos, Asociación Americana del Avance de la Ciencia. Archived from the original (Online edition) on 22 April 2005.
- Conkling, Alfred R. (1884). Appleton's guide to Mexico, including a chapter on Guatemala, and a complete English-Spanish vocabulary. New York: D. Appleton and Company.
- Conservation International (2007). "Biodiversity Hotspots-Mesoamerica-Overview". Conservation International. Archived from the original on 4 July 2008.
- Cooper, Allan (2008). The Geography of Genocide. University Press of America. p. 171. ISBN 978-0761840978.
- Coronado Aguilar, Manuel (1968). "Así murió el general J. Rufino Barrios". El Imparcial (in Spanish). Guatemala.
- Cullather, Nick (1999). Secret History: The CIA's classified account of its operations in Guatemala, 1952–1954. Stanford, California: Stanford University Press. ISBN 0-8047-3311-2.
- Cullather, Nicholas (2006). Secret History: The CIA's Classified Account of its Operations in Guatemala 1952–54 (2nd ed.). Stanford University Press. ISBN 9780804754682.
- Cullather, Nicholas (23 May 1997). CIA and Assassinations: The Guatemala 1954 Documents (Report). National Security Archive Electronic. Vol. Briefing Book No. 4. National Security Archive.
- de Aerenlund, C. (2006). Voyage to an Unknown Land: The saga of an Italian Family from Lombardy to Guatemala. Xlibris Corporation. ISBN 1-4257-0187-6.
- De los Ríos, Efraín (1948). Ombres contra Hombres (in Spanish). Fondo para Cultura de la Universidad de México, México.
- Diario de Centro América (1978). "Entrevista a Walter Overdick, alcalde de Panzós". Diario de Centro América, Periódico Oficial de la República de Guatemala (in Spanish). Guatemala.
- Díaz Molina, Carlos Leonidas (1998). "Que fluya la verdad". Revista Crónica (in Spanish). Guatemala.
- Dosal, Paul J. (1993). Doing Business with the Dictators: A Political History of United Fruit in Guatemala. Wilmington, Delaware: Scholarly Resources Inc.
- El Periódico (31 January 2012). "Quema de embajada española". elPeriódico. Guatemala. Archived from the original on 30 October 2013.
- Figueroa, Luis (2011). "Bombazo en el Palacio Nacional". Luis Figueroa Blog (in Spanish). Archived from the original on 26 June 2014.
- Forster, Cindy (2001). The time of freedom: campesino workers in Guatemala's October Revolution. University of Pittsburgh Press. ISBN 9780822941620.
- Foster, Lynn V. (2000). A Brief History of Central America. New York: Facts On File, Inc. ISBN 0-8160-3962-3.
- Friedman, Max Paul (2003). Nazis and good neighbors: the United States campaign against the Germans of Latin America in World War II. Cambridge University Press. pp. 82–83. ISBN 9780521822466.
- Garcia Ferreira, Roberto (2008). "The CIA and Jacobo Arbenz: The story of a disinformation campaign". Journal of Third World Studies. XXV (2). United States: 59.
- García, Jody (31 January 2013). "Una crónica impactante en el aniversario de la quema de la Embajada de España tras 33 años de impunidad". Diario La Hora. Guatemala. Archived from the original on 7 December 2013.
- Gleijeses, Piero (1992). Shattered hope: the Guatemalan revolution and the United States, 1944–1954. United States: Princeton University Press. ISBN 9780691025568.
- Gómez C., Enrique (1898). "Upcoming presidential elections". La idea liberal (in Spanish). Guatemala: Guatemala.
- Gómez Carrillo, Enrique (1898). "Interview from Enrique Gómez Carrillo with His Excellency, President Manuel Estrada Cabrera". Diario de Centro América (in Spanish). Guatemala.
- González Davison, Fernando (2008). La montaña infinita; Carrera, caudillo de Guatemala (in Spanish). Guatemala: Artemis y Edinter. ISBN 978-84-89452-81-7.
- Grandin, Greg (2000). The blood of Guatemala: a history of race and nation. Duke University Press. ISBN 9780822324959.
- Guateantaño (17 October 2011). "Parques y plazas antiguas de Guatemala". Guatepalabras Blogspot. Guatemala. Archived from the original on 27 January 2015.
- Handy, Jim (1994). Revolution in the Countryside: Rural Conflict and Agrarian Reform in Guatemala, 1944-1954. Univ of North Carolina Press. ISBN 9780807844380.
- Hansen, Richard D (2005). "Perspectives on Olmec-Maya interaction in the Middle Formative period". In Powis, Terry G. (ed.). New Perspectives on Formative Mesoamerican Cultures. Archaeopress. ISBN 978-1-84171-817-0.
- Hernández de León, Federico (1959). "El capítulo de las efemérides: José Milla y Rafael Carrera". Diario La Hora (in Spanish). Guatemala.
- Hernández de León, Federico (1930). El libro de las efemérides (in Spanish). Vol. Tomo III. Guatemala: Tipografía Sánchez y de Guise.
- IEPALA (1980). Guatemala, un futuro próximo (in Spanish). Madrid: Artigrafía; Instituto de Estudios Políticos para América Latina y Africa. ISBN 9788485436101.
- Immerman, Richard H. (1983). The CIA in Guatemala: The Foreign Policy of Intervention. University of Texas Press. ISBN 9780292710832.
- Informe REHMI (n.d.). "Recuperación de la Memoria Histórica: Tomo II. Los Mecanismos de la violencia". Derechos Humanos Website (in Spanish). Archived from the original on 15 June 2012.
- Instituto Nacional de Estadística (2014). "Poblacion de Guatemala (Demografía)". Instituto Nacional de Estadística (INE) (in Spanish). Guatemala. Archived from the original on 14 March 2014.
- International Monetary Fund (2013). "Guatemala". International Monetary Fund online. Archived from the original on 5 July 2014.
- Koeppel, Dan (2008). Banana: The Fate of the Fruit That Changed the World. New York: Hudson Street Press. p. 153.
- Krehm, William (1999). Democracies and Tyrannies of the Caribbean in the 1940s. COMER Publications. ISBN 9781896266817.
- La otra memoria histórica (5 December 2011). "Guatemala, viudas y huérfanos que dejó el comunismo". La otra memoria histórica (in Spanish). Guatemala. Archived from the original on 7 December 2013.
- LaFeber, Walter (1993). Inevitable revolutions: the United States in Central America. W. W. Norton & Company. pp. 77–79. ISBN 9780393309645.
- Loveman, Brian; Davies, Thomas M. (1997). The Politics of antipolitics: the military in Latin America (3rd, revised ed.). Rowman & Littlefield. ISBN 9780842026116.
- Marroquín Rojas, Clemente (1971). Francisco Morazán y Rafael Carrera (in Spanish). Guatemala: Piedrasanta.
- Martínez Peláez, Severo (1988). Racismo y Análisis Histórico de la Definición del Indio Guatemalteco (in Spanish). Guatemala: Departamento de Publicaciones, Facultad de Ciencias Económicas, Universidad de San Carlos.
- Martínez Peláez, Severo (1990). La patria del criollo; ensayo de interpretación de la realidad colonial guatemalteca (in Spanish). México: Ediciones en Marcha.
- McCleary, Rachel (1999). Dictating Democracy: Guatemala and the End of Violent Revolution (Illustrated ed.). University Press of Florida. ISBN 9780813017266.
- McCreery, David (1994). Rural Guatemala, 1760–1940. Stanford University Press. ISBN 9780804723183.
- Mendoza, Juan Manuel (1946). Biografía de Enrique Gómez Carrillo: su vida, su obra y su época (in Spanish) (2nd ed.). Guatemala: Tipografía Nacional.
- Mendizábal, A.B. (n.d.). Estado y políticas de desarrollo agrario: la masacre campesina de Panzós (in Spanish). Guatemala.
- Mendizábal P., Ana Beatriz (1978). "Estado y Políticas de Desarrollo Agrario. La Masacre Campesina de Panzós" (PDF). Escuela de Ciencia Política (in Spanish). Guatemala: Universidad de San Carlos de Guatemala. Archived from the original (PDF) on 27 May 2014.
- Miceli, Keith (1974). "Rafael Carrera: Defender and Promoter of Peasant Interests in Guatemala, 1837–1848". The Americas. 31 (1). Academy of American Franciscan History: 72–95. doi:10.1017/S000316150008843X. JSTOR 980382. S2CID 197669388.
- Montenegro, Gustavo Adolfo (2005). "Yo, el Supremo". Revista Domigo de Prensa Libre (in Spanish). Archived from the original on 6 October 2014.
- Montúfar, Lorenzo; Salazar, Ramón A. (1892). El centenario del general Francisco Morazán (in Spanish). Guatemala: Tipografía Nacional.
- Morazán, Francisco (1942). Testamento y memorias del general Francisco Morazán (in Spanish).
- North American Congress on Latin America (1984). NACLA Report on the Americas.
- Ortiz, Oscar G. (2007). "Jesús de las Tres Potencias". Cuaresma y Semana Santa (in Spanish). Guatemala. Archived from the original on 22 February 2007.
- Paterson, Thomas G.; Clifford, J. Garry; Maddock, Shane J.; Kisatsky, Deborah; Hogan, Kenneth J., eds. (2009). American foreign relations: a history. Vol. 2: Since 1895. Belmont, Calif: Wadsworth. ISBN 9780547225692.
- Platero Trabanino, Oscar German (2013). "La farsa del genocidio en Guatemala" (PDF). Fundación Contra el Terrorismo (in Spanish). Guatemala: Mi ejército, sitio oficial.
- "Avalancha terrorista en contra de la manifestación de mañana; poder público y transporte extraurbano blancos de ataque". Prensa Libre. Guatemala. 6 September 1980.
- Rabe, Stephen G. (1988). Eisenhower and Latin America: The Foreign Policy of Anticommunism. Chapel Hill: University of North Carolina Press. ISBN 9780807842041.
- Rain Forest Wordpress (4 April 2013). "Guatemala Rainforest Interesting fact | rainforest facts". Rainforestcentralamerica.wordpress.com.
- Rakosy, Betsy (23 May 2012). "Victimization – the EXMIBAL Story". MAC: Mines and communities. Archived from the original on 6 October 2014.
- Richards, Michael (1985). "Cosmopolitan world-view and counterinsurgency in Guatemala". Anthropological Quarterly. 58 (3): 94. doi:10.2307/3317916. JSTOR 3317916.
- Rosa, Ramón (1974). Historia del Benemérito Gral. Don Francisco Morazán, ex Presidente de la República de Centroamérica (in Spanish). Tegucigalpa: Ministerio de Educación Pública, Ediciones Técnicas Centroamericana.
- Rugeley, Terry (1996). Yucatán's Maya Peasantry and the Origins of the Caste War. San Antonio, Texas: University of Texas. ISBN 978-0-292-77078-2.
- Rugeley, Terry (2001). Maya Wars: Ethnographic Accounts from Nineteenth Century Yucatán. Norman: University of Oklahoma Press. ISBN 978-0806133553.
- Sabino, Carlos (2007). Guatemala, la historia silenciada (1944–1989) (in Spanish). Vol. Tomo 1: Revolución y Liberación. Guatemala: Fondo Nacional para la Cultura Económica.
- Shillington, John (2002). Grappling with atrocity: Guatemalan theater in the 1990s. Fairleigh Dickinson University Press. pp. 38–39. ISBN 9780838639306.
- Solano, Luis (2012). Contextualización histórica de la Franja Transversal del Norte (FTN) (PDF). Centro de Estudios y Documentación de la Frontera Occidental de Guatemala, CEDFOG. Archived from the original (PDF) on 13 November 2014.
- Stephens, John Lloyd; Catherwood, Frederick (1854). Incidents of travel in Central America, Chiapas, and Yucatán. London, England: Arthur Hall, Virtue and Co.
- Streeter, Stephen M. (2000). Managing the counterrevolution: the United States and Guatemala, 1954–1961. Ohio University Press. ISBN 9780896802155.
- Striffler, Steve; Moberg, Mark (2003). Banana wars: power, production, and history in the Americas. Duke University Press. ISBN 9780822331964.
- Taracena, Arturo (2011). Invención criolla, sueño ladino, pesadilla indigena, Los Altos de Guatemala: de región a Estado, 1740–1871 (in Spanish) (3rd ed.). Guatemala: Biblioteca básica de historia de Guatemala. ISBN 978-9929-587-42-7. Archived from the original on 9 January 2016.
- Torres Espinoza, Enrique (2007). Enrique Gómez Carrillo, el cronista errante (in Spanish) (2nd ed.). Guatemala: Artemis-Edinter.
- Trigger, Bruce G.; Washburn, Wilcomb E.; Adams, Richard E. W. (2000). The Cambridge History of the Native Peoples of the Americas.
- Troika study abroad programs (2006). "Guatemala". Community colleges for international development. Archived from the original on 18 September 2010.
- United Nations (2011). "Human Development Report 2011; Statistical annex" (PDF). United Nations online. Archived from the original (PDF) on 11 January 2012.
- Velásquez, S. (8 August 1997). "Crímenes de la Guerrilla" (PDF). Revista Crónica (in Spanish). Guatemala.
- Weaver, Frederic S. (March 1999). "Reform and (Counter) Revolution in Post-Independence Guatemala: Liberalism, Conservatism, and Postmodern Controversies". Latin American Perspectives. 26 (2): 129–158. doi:10.1177/0094582x9902600207. JSTOR 2634298. S2CID 143757705.
- White, Douglas R. (2002). The Marriage Core of the Elite Network of Colonial Guatemala (PDF). Irvine, California: University of California, Irvine, School of Social Sciences. Archived from the original (PDF) on 10 December 2004.
- Wilhelm of Sweden (1922). Between two continents, notes from a journey in Central America, 1920. London, UK: E. Nash and Grayson, Ltd. pp. 148–209.
- Woodward, Ralph Lee (1993). Rafael Carrera and the Emergence of the Republic of Guatemala, 1821–1871. Athens, GA: University of Georgia Press. ISBN 978-0820314488.
- Vice President's Task Force on Combating Terrorism (1989). Terrorist Group Profiles (Illustrated ed.). DIANE. p. 86. ISBN 9781568068640.
