= Battle of La Arada =

Battle of 1851 in Central America

Coordinates: 14.7167°N 89.5833°W

- Part of the Guatemalan–Salvadoran War
Date	2 February 1851
Location	Chiquimula, Guatemala
Result	Guatemalan victory

Belligerents
Guatemala	El Salvador; Honduras; Guatemalan Liberals

Commanders and leaders
Mariano Paredes (President of Guatemala); Rafael Carrera; Vicente Cerna y Cerna; Mariano Álvarez; Ignacio García Granados; Leandro Navas; Joaquín Solares; Manuel María Bolaños	Juan Lindo (President of Honduras); Doroteo Vasconcelos; José Trinidad Cabañas; Ramón Belloso; José Santos Guardiola; Indalecio Cordero; Gerardo Barrios; Domingo Asturias; José Dolores Nufio; Ciriaco Bran y Carrascosa; Doroteo Monterroso

Strength
2,000	4,500

Casualties and losses
Less than 25 killed	528 killed, 1,000+ injured

The Battle of La Arada (Spanish: Batalla de la Arada) was fought on 2 February 1851 near the town of Chiquimula in Guatemala, between the forces of Guatemala and an Allied army from Honduras and El Salvador. As the most serious threat to Guatemala's liberty and sovereignty as a republic, it was the most important military victory in the country's history as an independent state.

== Background ==
After Rafael Carrera returned from exile in 1849, the Salvadoran ruler, Doroteo Vasconcelos, granted asylum to the Guatemalan liberals, who harassed the Guatemalan government in several different forms: Don José Francisco Barrundia did it through a liberal newspaper that had been established with that specific goal; Vasconcelos gave support during a whole year to a rebel faction "La Montaña", in eastern Guatemala, providing and distributing money and weapons. By late 1850, Vasconcelos was getting impatient due to the slowness of the progress of the war with Guatemala and decided to plan an open attack. Under that circumstance, the Salvadoran head of state started a campaign against the conservative Guatemalan regime, inviting Honduras and Nicaragua to participate in the alliance; only the Honduran government led by Don Juan Lindo accepted.

Meanwhile, in Guatemala, where the invasion plans were perfectly well-known, President Don Mariano Paredes started taking precautions to face the situation, while the Guatemalan Archbishop, Don Francisco de Paula García Peláez, ordered peace prayers in the archdiocese.

On 4 January 1851, Vasconcelos and Lindo met in Ocotepeque, Honduras, where they signed an alliance against Guatemala. The Salvadoran army had 4,000 men, properly trained and armed and supported by artillery; the Honduran army numbered 2,000 men. The coalition army was stationed in Metapán, El Salvador, due to its proximity with both the Guatemalan and Honduran borders.

== Declaration of war ==
On 28 January 1851, the Salvadoran president sent a letter to the Guatemalan Ministry of Foreign Relations, in which he stated the following:

1. He demanded that the Guatemalan president relinquish power, so that the alliance could designate a new head of state loyal to the liberals.
2. He demanded that Rafael Carrera be exiled, escorted to any of the Guatemalan southern ports by a Salvadoran regiment.
3. That once the invading alliance took power in Guatemala, they would convene a constituent assembly.
4. That the Salvadoran army could occupy any Guatemalan territory they deemed necessary, for an indefinite time.

The Guatemalan government responded laconically in the following terms:

"You have no authority under the laws of San Salvador to make declarations of war, neither can you send troops without permission from the senate. Presenting yourselves armed and declaring war on Guatemala, the government considers you and those in your company as seditious, executing an affront against the sovereignty and freedom of the Republic of Guatemala. We cannot therefore do anything else than communicate to the Commander in Chief of the Guatemalan Army, the announcement that you will send your troops into this territory, so that he takes the appropriate measures to preserve the honor and sovereignty of the Republic. May God guard you many years."

== Battle ==
The Allied army entered Guatemalan territory at three different places. On 29 January, a 500-man contingent entered through Piñuelas, Agua Blanca and Jutiapa, led by General Vicente Baquero, but the majority of the invading force marched from Metapán. The Allied army of 4,500 men was commanded by the following:

- Doroteo Vasconcelos, President of El Salvador and Commander in Chief.
- General Isidoro Saget, Chief of Staff of the Army, was an experienced French soldier, who had participated in prior wars against Guatemala.
- General José Santos Guardiola, commander of the 1st Division.
- General Ramón Belloso, commander of the 2nd Division.
- General Indalecio Cordero, commander of the 3rd Division.
- General Domingo Asturias, commander of the 4th Division.
- General José Trinidad Cabañas, commander of the Honduran Division.
- General Gerardo Barrios, commander of the "San Miguel" Division.

Additional troops were led by the Salvadoran General Ciriaco Bran y Carrascosa and by the liberal Guatemalan Generals José Dolores Nufio and Doroteo Monterroso.

Guatemala was able to recruit 2,000 men, led by:

- Lieutenant General Rafael Carrera, Commander in Chief.
- Colonel Manuel María Bolaños.
- Colonel Vicente Cerna Sandoval, Corregidor (Mayor) of Chiquimula.
- Colonel Ignacio García Granados, commander of the 1st Division.
- Colonel Joaquín Solares, commander of the 2nd Division.
- Lieutenant Colonel Leandro Navas, commander of the Rearguard.
- Colonel Mariano Álvarez, Artillery officer.

Carrera's strategy was to feign a retreat, forcing the enemy forces to follow the "retreating" troops to a place he had previously chosen; on February 1, 1851, both armies were facing each other with only the San José river between them. Carrera had fortified the foothills of La Arada, its summit about 50 metres (160 ft) above the level of the river. A meadow 300 metres (980 ft) deep lay between the hill and the river, and boarding the meadow was a sugar cane plantation. Carrera divided his army in three sections: the left wing was led by Cerna and Solares; the right wing led by Bolaños. He personally led the central battalion, where he placed his artillery. Five hundred men stayed in Chiquimula to defend the city and to aid in a possible retreat, leaving only 1,500 Guatemalans against an enemy of 4,500.

=== February 2nd, 1851 ===
The battle began at 8:30 AM, when Allied troops initiated an attack at three different points, with an intense fire opened by both armies. The first Allied attack was repelled by the defenders of the foothill; during the second attack, the Allied troops were able to take the first line of trenches. They were subsequently expelled. During the third attack, the Allied force advanced to a point where it was impossible to distinguish between Guatemalan and Allied troops. Then, the fight became a melee, while the Guatemalan artillery severely punished the invaders. At the height of the battle when the Guatemalans faced an uncertain fate, Carrera ordered that sugar cane plantation around the meadow to be set on fire. The invading army was now surrounded: to the front, they faced the furious Guatemalan fire, to the flanks, a huge fire and to the rear, the river, all of which made retreat very difficult. The central division of the Allied force panicked and started a disorderly retreat. General Saget ordered a retreat for the division of General Cabañas. The Honduran division which was fighting alongside the Salvadorans in the center also retreated in panic. Soon, all of the Allied troops started retreating, but more than a retreat, it was a rout. Guatemalan historian Francis Polo Sifontes describes the scene after the battle:

"...around five in the afternoon, the fire was less intense and the eastern sun illuminated a terrible scene: amid the smoke and ash, the field was full of corpses. When the battle came to an end, people noticed that the Guatemalan Chief was nowhere to be seen; the search for his body started and he was found, alive, laying [sic] on his back under the shadow of a tree, with his arms crossed and breathing slowly; his right hand still brandished his sabre, covered in blood. He could not let go of it because his swollen hand did not allow it."

The 500 men of the rearguard under Colonel Navas were still fresh and pursued what was left of the Allied army, which desperately fled for the borders of their respective countries. The final count of the Allied losses were 528 dead, 200 prisoners, 1,000 rifles, 13,000 rounds of ammunition, many pack animals and baggage, 11 drums and seven artillery pieces. Polo Sifontes also noted: "...President Vasconcelos sought refuge in El Salvador, while two Generals mounted on the same horse were seen crossing the Honduran border." Carrera regrouped his army and crossed the Salvadoran border, occupying Santa Ana, before he received orders from the Guatemalan President, Mariano Paredes, to return to Guatemala, since the Allies were requesting a cease-fire and a peace treaty.

== Consequences ==
As an immediate result of the triumph of the Guatemalan Army at La Arada, a National Constituent Assembly enacted, on October 19, 1851, a Fundamental Letter of Government, called Acta Constitutiva de la República ("Constitutive Act of the Republic"). It was brief, with only 18 articles, but established the general principles of the Republic of Guatemala, which had been formed four years earlier. The battle of La Arada represented the dominance of Guatemala in Central America and ensured a period of restoration, security and economic progress. It also marked the beginning of Rafael Carrera's position as President for Life.

== See also ==
- Federal Republic of Central America
- History of Guatemala
- History of Honduras
- History of El Salvador
- History of Central America

== Bibliography ==
- Woodward, Ralph Lee (1993). Rafael Carrera and the Emergence of the Republic of Guatemala, 1821-1871. Athens, GA: University of Georgia Press.
