= Vicente Cerna y Cerna =

Guatemalan president (1815–1885)

Field Marshal Vicente Cerna y Cerna
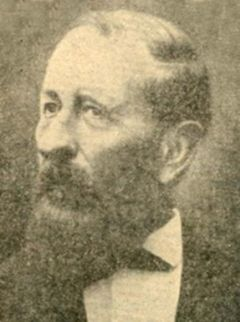
- Cerna c. 1865–1885

7th President of Guatemala
- In office 24 May 1865 – 29 June 1871
- Preceded by: Pedro de Aycinena y Piñol
- Succeeded by: Miguel García Granados

Personal details
- Born: 22 January 1815 Ipala, Chiquimula, Kingdom of Guatemala
- Died: 27 June 1885 (aged 70) Guatemala City, Guatemala
- Party: Conservative

Vicente Cerna y Cerna (22 January 1815 – 27 June 1885) was president of Guatemala from 24 May 1865 to 29 June 1871. Loyal friend and comrade of Rafael Carrera, was appointed army's Field Marshal after Carraera's victory against Salvadorian leader Gerardo Barrios in 1863. He was appointed Carrera's successor after the caudillo's death in 1865 even though Guatemalan leaders would have preferred Field Marshal José Víctor Zavala.

After the presidential elections of 1869, that Cerna won over liberal candidate Zavala, there were severe fraud accusations, and from then on Cerna's presidency was marred by constant uprising until he was eventually ousted by the liberal leaders Miguel Garcia Granados and Justo Rufino Barrios on 30 June 1871.

== Biography ==
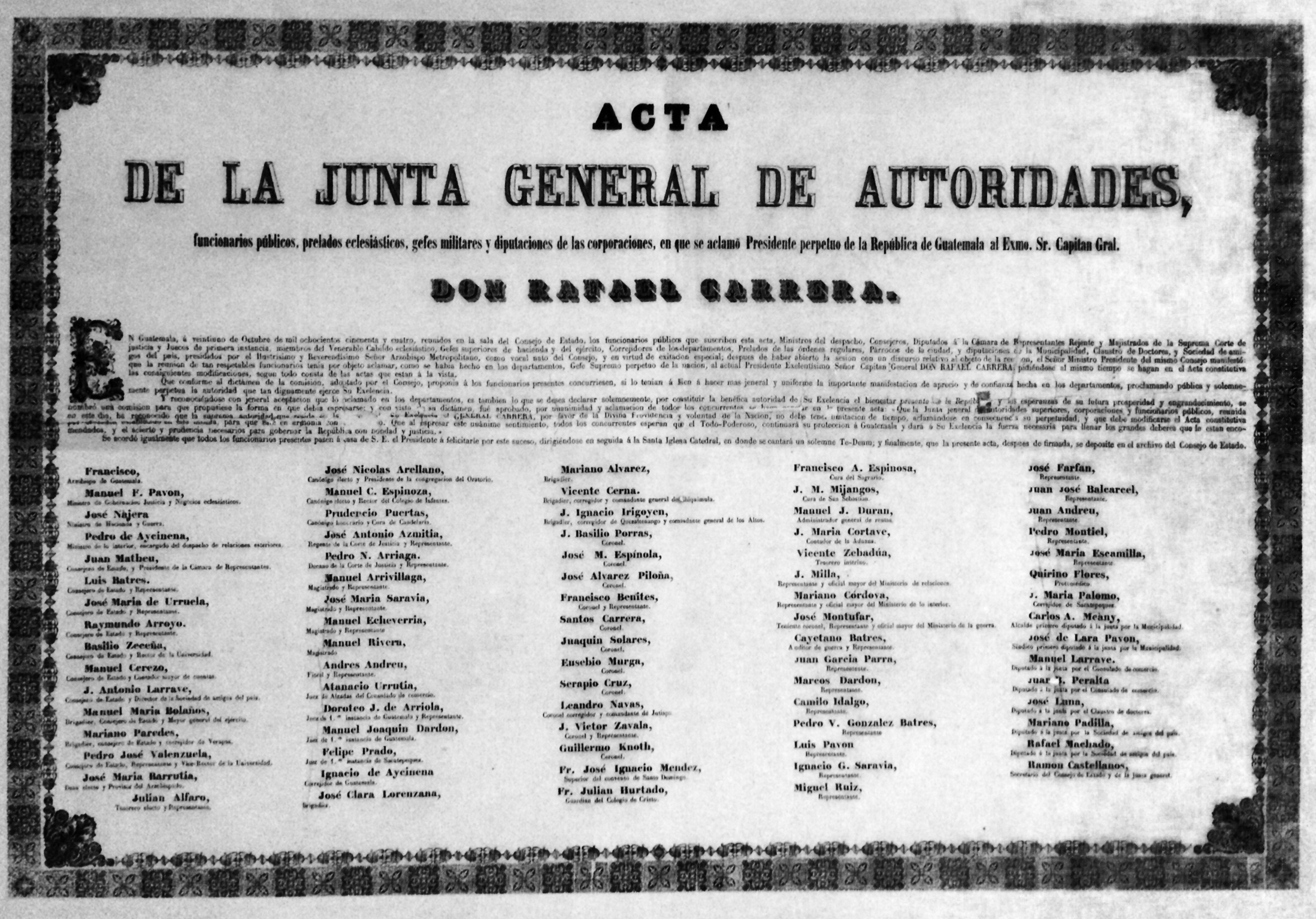
The facsimile of the act where Rafael Carrera is declared president for life of Guatemala; Cerna y Cerna was one of the signatories. Museo Nacional de Historia de Guatemala.

Cerna y Cerna was from Ipala, Chiquimula where he later served as major and "Corregidor". He was a loyal friend and camarade of Rafael Carrera and was a distinguished officer of the caudillo's army. He was one of the Guatemalan officers in the Battle of La Arada as colonel, when he was Chiquimula in 1851. Later on, he was among those who signed the act that declared Carrera, "Guatemalan president for life" in 1854. His high army and government ranks allowed him to reach the presidency after Carrera's death in 1865.

=== Battle of La Arada ===
Salvadorian president Doroteo Vasconcelos granted asylum to many Guatemalan liberals, among which was José Francisco Barrundia who started a newspaper to attack Carrera's conservative regime. Vasconcelos also supplied money and weapons and supported for a whole year the rebels of "La Montaña" in the east of Guatemala. By the end of 1850, Vasconcelos grew tired of the slow war against Guatemala and decided to act openly. Then, he started a liberal crusade against the conservative regime of Guatemala and invited Honduras and Nicaragua to join; however, only Honduran president Juan Lindo accepted to join the invasion. Meanwhile, in Guatemala, where they well aware of Vasconcelos' plans, president Paredes made the necessary preparations for an invasion and archbishop Francisco de Paula García Peláez asked his archdioceses to pray for peace.

On 4 January 1851, in Ocotepeque met the presidents from Honduras and El Salvador, to seal the alliance against Guatemala. The Salvadorian forces were four thousand men well equipped and with artillery support, while the Honduras forces were two thousand men. The main force settled in Metapán, as this place was close to all three countries.

The "Battle of La Arada", in which Cerna y Cerna had a brilliant role commanding one of the Guatemalan battalions, was fought on 2 February 1851 close to Chiquimula in Guatemala. The battle was the largest threat to Guatemala republican sovereignty; however, Guatemalan Commander in Chief Carrera's strategy resulted in a complete victory for his forces who only suffered 125 casualties between dead and wounded, while the enemy forces had more than 1500 casualties.

After Battle of La Arada, on 22 October 1851 president Paredes resigned; the National Assembly then named Carrera his successor, being inaugurated on 6 November 1851 after modifying the Constitution to suit his needs. Paredes went on to the army staff and was a loyal officer until his death in 1856.

=== Campaign against Gerado Barrios ===
In 1863 Honduran general José María Medina, along his Army Staff -which included Florencio Xatruch, and lieutenant colonel Juan Antonio Medina Orellana, were in talks with Rafael Carrera, who formed an army of Hondurans, Salvadorians and Guatemalans who, led by brigadier general Vicente Cerna y Cerna invaded Honduras. Cerna forces took Cucuyagua on 10 June 1863 and then "Los Llanos" de Santa Rosa on 15 June, eventually occupying Gracias a Dios and declaring José María Medina as President of Honduras;. Finally, Cerna and his men marched over capital Comayagua to overthrow interim president José Francisco Montes Fonseca. Government forces set Comayagua in flames before fleeing given the superiority of Cerna's army.

== Government ==
Several liberal authors, like Alfonso Enrique Barrientos describe Marshal Cerna's government as this:

A conservative and archaic government, badly organized and with worse intentions, was in charge of the country, centralizing all powers in Vicente Cerna, ambitious military man, who not happy with the general rank, had promoted himself to the Army Marshal rank, even though that rank did no exist and it does not exist in the Guatemalan military. The Marshal called himself President of the Republic, but in reality he was the foreman of oppressed and savaged people, cowardly enough that they had not dared to tell the dictator to leave threatening him with a revolution.

It is necessary to make the following observations about the liberal comments:

1. By "conservative and archaic government, badly organized and with worse intentions", Barrientos means that State and Church were a single unit and that the conservative regime was strongly allied to the power of regular clergy of the Catholic Church, who then were among the largest landowners in Guatemala. The tight relationship between Church and State had been ratified by the Concordat of 1852, which was the law until Cerna was deposed in 1871.
2. Oppressed and savaged people: Barrientos refers here to the liberal criollos, who had not dare to rise against Rafael Carrera presidency (1840-1865). Even the liberal generals like Serapio Cruz had realized the undeniable Carrera's political and military presence who was practically invincible, and even fought under his command. Actually, the liberals waited for a long time until Carrera's death to begin their revolt against the more tamed Cerna.
3. The Army Marshal rank did exist in the Conservative Guatemalan Army: after the invasion to El Salvador, officers Serapio Cruz -Tata Lapo- and José Víctor Zavala also were promoted to the Marshal rank, along Cerna. They all were of great importance to the military life of Guatemala during Carrera's presidency.

During his presidency liberal party members were prosecuted and sent into exile; among them, those who started the Liberal Revolution of 1871. Around that time, Honduran liberal intellectual Ramón Rosa lived in Guatemala and started publishing a newspaper called El Centroamericano (The Central American), a liberal pamphlet that strongly attacked the conservative regime.

Finally, the Mexican president Benito Juárez sent reinforcement to the troops in Chiapas, commanded by Miguel García Granados and Justo Rufino Barrios. After two devastating defeats on 23 June in Totonicapán and on 28 June in San Lucas Sacatepequez, Cerna resigned on 28 June 1871.

== Notes and references ==
=== Bibliography ===
- Aycinena, Pedro de (1854). Concordato entre la Santa Sede y el presidente de la República de Guatemala (in Latin and Spanish). Guatemala: Imprenta La Paz.
- Barrientos, Alfonso Enrique (1948). "Ramón Rosa y Guatemala" (PDF). Revista del archivo y biblioteca nacionales. 27 (3–4). Honduras. Archived from the original (PDF) on 19 December 2014.
- González Davison, Fernando (2008). La montaña infinita; Carrera, caudillo de Guatemala (in Spanish). Guatemala: Artemis y Edinter. ISBN 978-84-89452-81-7.
- Hernández de León, Federico (1930). El libro de las efemérides (in Spanish). Vol. Tomo III. Guatemala: Tipografía Sánchez y de Guise.
- — (1959). "El capítulo de las efemérides: Segunda invasión de Morazán". Diario la Hora (in Spanish). Guatemala.
- López Vallecillos, Italo (1966). Gerardo Barrios y su tiempo (in Spanish). San Salvador, El Salvador: Dirección Nacional de Publicaciones del Ministerio de Educación.
- Martínez Peláez, Severo [in Spanish] (1988). Racismo y Análisis Histórico de la Definición del Indio Guatemalteco (in Spanish). Guatemala: Editorial Universitaria.
- — (1990). La patria del criollo; ensayo de interpretación de la realidad colonial guatemalteca (in Spanish). México: Ediciones en Marcha.
- Montúfar, Lorenzo; Salazar, Ramón A. (1892). El centenario del general Francisco Morazán (in Spanish). Guatemala: Tipografía Nacional.
- Sierra González, Aida Lucila (2001). "La batalla de la Arada" (PDF). Servicio de Historia Militar, Sección de Investigaciones Históricas (in Spanish). Guatemala: Museo Militar. Archived from the original (PDF) on 21 December 2014.
- Weaver, F.S. (March 1999). "Reform and (Counter) Revolution in Post-Independence Guatemala: Liberalism, Conservatism, and Postmodern Controversies". Latin American Perspectives. 26 (2): 129–158. doi:10.1177/0094582X9902600207. S2CID 143757705.
- Woodward, Ralph Lee (1993). Rafael Carrera and the Emergence of the Republic of Guatemala, 1821-1871. Athens, GA: University of Georgia Press. ISBN 9780820343600.
- Zúñiga Huete (1987). Historia Cronológica de Honduras (in Spanish). Vol. 1. Honduras.

Political offices
Preceded by Pedro de Aycinena	President of Guatemala; 1865–1871	Succeeded by Miguel García Granados
