= 1850 Salvadoran presidential election =

- 26 January 1850
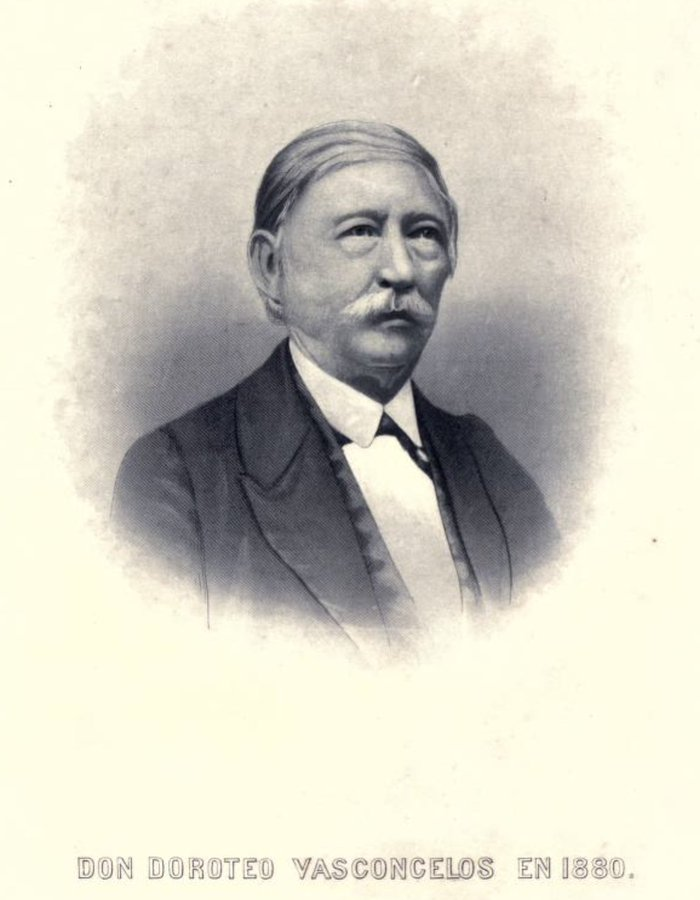
Candidate	Doroteo Vasconcelos
Party	Liberal
Running mate	José Félix Quirós
President before election
Ramón Rodríguez
Independent
Elected President
Doroteo Vasconcelos
Liberal

Presidential elections were held in El Salvador on 26 January 1850. Doroteo Vasconcelos, who was the incumbent, ran unopposed and was elected by the legislature. The constitution was amended to allow his reelection.

== Results ==
Candidate	Party
Doroteo Vasconcelos	Liberal
Total
Source: University of California, San Diego
