= Mariano Paredes (Guatemalan politician) =

President of Guatemala

Mariano Peredes

4th President of Guatemala
- In office 1 January 1849 – 6 November 1851
- Preceded by: José Bernardo Escobar
- Succeeded by: Rafael Carrera

Personal details
- Born: c. 1800 Province of Guatemala, Captaincy General of Guatemala, Spanish Empire
- Died: 1856 (aged 55 - 56) Santiago de Cuba, Cuba

Military service
- Allegiance: Guatemala
- Rank: General
- The flag shown for Guatemala corresponds to the time Paredes lived: this flag was official from 1843 to 1851.

Mariano Paredes (1800–1856) was President of Guatemala from January 1, 1849 to November 6, 1851 as a compromise chief of state. Paredes, an army colonel, came to power after Rafael Carrera was ineffective in quelling uprisings in eastern Guatemala and short-term governments failed to restore order. But Mariano Paredes was unable to control Guatemala.

== Presidency ==
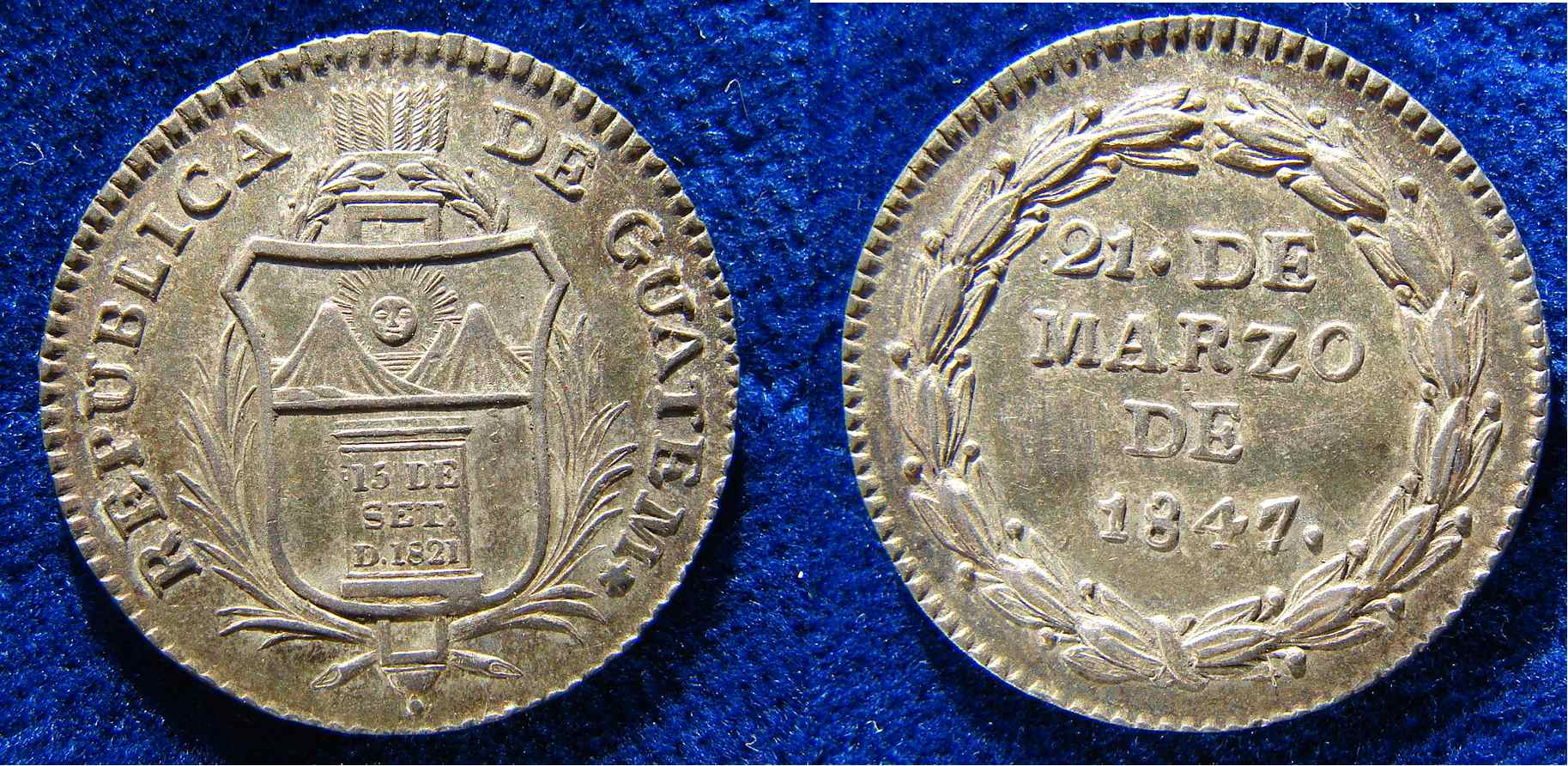
Proclamation Coin 1847 of the independent Republic of Guatemala

During his first term as president (1844-1848), Rafael Carrera had brought the country back from excessive conservatism to a traditional climate; however, in 1848, the liberals were able to force Rafael Carrera to leave office, after the country had been in turmoil for several months. Carrera resigned at his own free will and left for México. The new liberal regime allied itself with the Aycinena family and swiftly passed a law where they emphatically ordered to execute Carrera if he dared to return to Guatemalan soil. On his absence, the liberal crillos from Quetzaltenango -led by general Agustín Guzmán who took over the city after Mariano Paredes was called to Guatemala City to take over the Presidential office- declared that Los Altos was an independent state once again on 26 August 1848; the new state had the support of Vasconcelos' regime in El Salvador and the rebel guerrilla army of Vicente and Serapio Cruz who were declared enemies of general Carrera. The interim government was led by Guzmán himself and had Florencio Molina and priest Fernando Davila as his Cabinet members. On 5 September 1848, the criollos altenses chose a formal government led by Fernando Antonio Martínez.

=== Return of Rafael Carrera ===
In the meantime, Carrera decided to return to Guatemala and did so entering by Huehuetenango, where he met with the native leaders and told them that they had to remain united to prevail; the leaders agreed and slowly the segregated native communities started developing a new Indian identity under Carrera's leadership. In the meantime, on the eastern part of Guatemala, the Jalapa region became increasingly dangerous; former president Mariano Rivera Paz and rebel leader Vicente Cruz were both murdered there after trying to take over the Corregidor office in 1849.

Upon learning that officer José Víctor Zavala had been appointed as Corregidor in Suchitepéquez, Carrera and his hundred jacalteco bodyguards crossed a dangerous jungle infested with jaguars to meet his former friend. When they met, Zavala not only did not capture him, but agreed to serve under his orders, thus sending a strong message to both liberal and conservatives in Guatemala City, that realized that they were forced to negotiate with Carrera, otherwise they were going to have to battle on two fronts -Quetzaltenango and Jalapa. Carrera went back to the Quetzaltenango area, while Zavala remained in Suchitepéquez as a tactical maneuver. Carrera received a visit from a Cabinet member of Paredes and told him that he had control of the native population and that he assured Paredes that he will keep them appeased. When the emissary returned to Guatemala City, he told the president everything Carrera said, and added that the native forces were formidable.

Agustín Guzmán, the altense leader, went to Antigua Guatemala to meet with another group of Paredes emissaries; they agreed that Los Altos would rejoin Guatemala, and that the latter would help Guzmán defeat his hated enemy and also build a port on the Pacific Ocean. Guzmán was sure of victory this time, but his plan evaporated when, in his absence, Carrera and his native allies had occupied Quetzaltenango; Carrera appointed Ignacio Yrigoyen as Corregidor and convinced him that he should work with the k'iche', mam, q'anjobal and mam leaders to keep the region under control. On his way out, Yrigoyen murmured to a friend: Now he is the King of the Indians, indeed!

Guzmán then left for Jalapa, where he stroke a deal with the rebels, while Luis Batres Juarros convinced president Paredes to deal with Carrera; Guzmán could only get a temporary truce from the revolt leaders León Raymundo, Roberto Reyes and Agustín Pérez; however, the truce was short lived, as the rebels sacked Jalapa on June 3 and 4. Guzman then left for El Salvador, where after a while he issued a note to the rest of liberal leaders in Central America in which he attacked the immorality and viciousness of the savage Rafael Carrera. Guzmán and Agustín Reyes invaded Guatemala later that year, and Carrera -now Army Commander in Chief- and his officer went after them; the rebels were able to escape and head to Guatemala City who had been left with very little protection from a small garrison. Guzmán and Reyes started a fire in Carrera's house, and then went to the National Palace to take over the government, but they were received with gunfire and a cannon that decimated their forces and wounded Guzman, who died shortly after.

=== Battle of La Arada ===
After Rafael Carrera returned from exile in 1849, Vasconcelos granted asylum to the Guatemalan liberals, who harassed the Guatemalan government in several different forms: José Francisco Barrundia did it through a liberal newspaper that had been established with that specific goal; Vasconcelos gave support during a whole year to a rebel faction "La Montaña", in eastern Guatemala, providing and distributing money and weapons. By late 1850, Vasconcelos was getting impatient due to the slowness of the progress of the war with Guatemala and decided to plan an open attack. Under that circumstance, the Salvadorean head of state started a campaign against the conservative Guatemalan regime, inviting Honduras and Nicaragua to participate in the alliance; only the Honduran government led by Juan Lindo accepted.

Meanwhile, in Guatemala, where the invasion plans were perfectly well-known, President Paredes started taking precautions to face the situation, while the Guatemalan Archbishop, Francisco García Peláez, ordered peace prayers in the archdiocese. (Note: Woodward 1993, op.cit.: "In the Conservative regime of Guatemala, the Catholic Church was entangled with the Government and the leaders of both were relatives, mostly of the Aycinena family.")

On 4 January 1851, Doroteo Vasconcelos and Juan Lindo met in Ocotepeque, Honduras, where they signed an alliance against Guatemala. The Salvadorean army had 4,000 men, properly trained and armed and supported by artillery; the Honduran army numbered 2,000 men. The coalition army was stationed in Metapán, El Salvador, due to its proximity with both the Guatemalan and Honduran borders.

On 28 January 1851, Vasconcelos sent a letter to the Guatemalan Ministry of Foreign Relations, in which he demanded that the Guatemalan president relinquish power, so that the alliance could designate a new head of state loyal to the liberals and that Rafael Carrera be exiled, escorted to any of the Guatemalan southern ports by a Salvadorean regiment. The Guatemalan government did not accept the terms and the Allied army entered Guatemalan territory at three different places. On 29 January, a 500-man contingent entered through Piñuelas, Agua Blanca and Jutiapa, led by General Vicente Baquero, but the majority of the invading force marched from Metapán. The Allied army was composed of 4,500 men led by Vasconcelos, as Commander in Chief. Other commanders were general José Santos Guardiola, general Ramón Belloso, general José Trinidad Cabañas, and general Gerardo Barrios. Guatemala was able to recruit 2,000 men, led by Lieutenant General Carrera as Commander in Chief and several colonels.

Carrera's strategy was to feign a retreat, forcing the enemy forces to follow the "retreating" troops to a place he had previously chosen; on February 1, 1851, both armies were facing each other with only the San José river between them. Carrera had fortified the foothills of La Arada, its summit about 50 metres (160 ft) above the level of the river. A meadow 300 metres (980 ft) deep lay between the hill and the river, and boarding the meadow was a sugar cane plantation. Carrera divided his army in three sections: the left wing was led by Cerna and Solares; the right wing led by Bolaños. He personally led the central battalion, where he placed his artillery. Five hundred men stayed in Chiquimula to defend the city and to aid in a possible retreat, leaving only 1,500 Guatemalans against an enemy of 4,500.

Carreras strategy work to perfection: The final count of the Allied losses were 528 dead, 200 prisoners, 1,000 rifles, 13,000 rounds of ammunition, many pack animals and baggage, 11 drums and seven artillery pieces. Vasconcelos sought refuge in El Salvador, while two Generals mounted on the same horse were seen crossing the Honduran border. Carrera regrouped his army and crossed the Salvadorean border, occupying Santa Ana, before he received orders from Paredes, to return to Guatemala, since the Allies were requesting a cease-fire and a peace treaty.

== Death ==
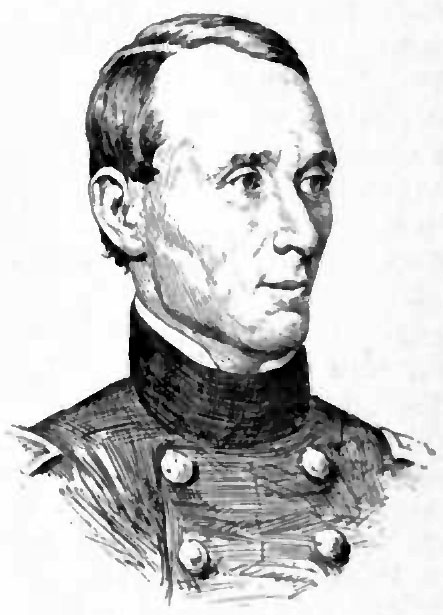
William Walker, American filibuster

After his victory in La Arada, Carrera was named president of Guatemala, and even President for Life in 1854. Paredes was a loyal member of his army then. In 1856, President Carrera sent general Paredes to Nicaragua in 1856 to participate in the National War of Nicaragua against William Walker as part of the Allied Army Central and commander of the Guatemalan expedition. He led his troops through Nicaraguan territory and then joined the column under colonel José Víctor Zavala with whom he went to Cojutepeque, achieving a landslide victory. However, there he got ill with cholera morbus and died without being able to complete his mission; Zavala took over and eventually helped the Allied Central American Army defect Walker.

== Bibliography ==
- Bethell, Leslie (1991). Central America since independence. CUP Archive. ISBN 0-521-42373-2.
- González Davison, Fernando (2008). La montaña infinita; Carrera, caudillo de Guatemala (in Spanish). Guatemala: Artemis y Edinter. ISBN 978-84-89452-81-7.
- Hernández de León, Federico (1959). "El capítulo de las efemérides: José Milla y Rafael Carrera". Diario La Hora (in Spanish). Guatemala.
- Hernández de León, Federico (1930). El libro de las efemérides (in Spanish). Vol. Tomo III. Guatemala: Tipografía Sánchez y de Guise.
- Kortheuer, Dennis (1994). "Rafael Carrera and the Emergence of the Republic of Guatemala: 1821-1871". The Historian. 57 (1). Academic OneFile.
- Martínez Peláez, Severo (1990). La patria del criollo; ensayo de interpretación de la realidad colonial guatemalteca (in Spanish). México: Ediciones en Marcha.
- Miceli, Keith (1974). "Rafael Carrera: Defender and Promoter of Peasant Interests in Guatemala, 1837-1848". The Americas. 31 (1): 72–95. doi:10.1017/S000316150008843X. S2CID 197669388.
- Museo Militar de Guatemala (n.d.). "Mariscal Zavala". Museo Militar de Guatemala (in Spanish). Guatemala: Ejército de Guatemala.
- Stephens, John Lloyd; Catherwood, Frederick (1854). Incidents of travel in Central America, Chiapas, and Yucatan. London, England: Arthur Hall, Virtue and Co.
- Taracena, Arturo (1999). Invención criolla, sueño ladino, pesadilla indigena, Los Altos de Guatemala: de región a Estado, 1740-1871 (in Spanish). Guatemala: CIRMA. Archived from the original on 2016-01-09.
- Weaver, Frederic S. (March 1999). "Reform and (Counter) Revolution in Post-Independence Guatemala: Liberalism, Conservatism, and Postmodern Controversies". Latin American Perspectives. 26 (2): 129–158. doi:10.1177/0094582x9902600207. S2CID 143757705.
- Woodward, Ralph Lee (1993). Rafael Carrera and the Emergence of the Republic of Guatemala, 1821-1871. Athens, GA: University of Georgia Press. ISBN 9780820343600.

== Notes ==
Political offices
Preceded by José Bernardo Escobar (Interim)	President of Guatemala; 1849-1851 (Interim)	Succeeded by Rafael Carrera
