= Doroteo Vasconcelos =

5th President of El Salvador (1848–1851)

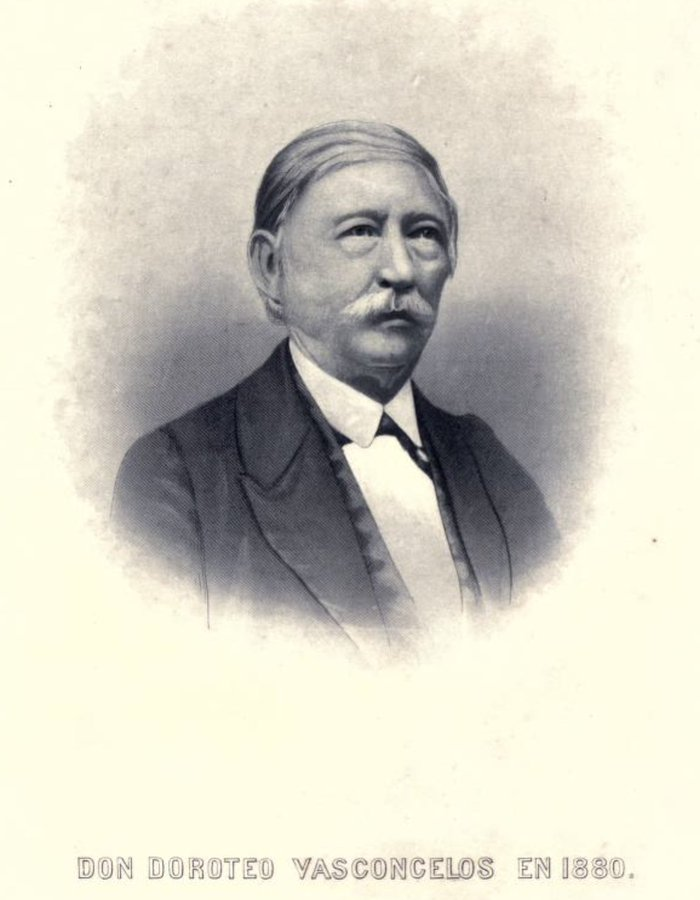
- Vasconcelos in 1880

5th President of El Salvador
- In office 4 February 1850 – 12 January 1851
- Vice President: José Félix Quirós
- Preceded by: Eugenio Aguilar
- Succeeded by: Francisco Dueñas
- In office 7 February 1848 – 26 January 1850
- Vice President: José Félix Quirós
- Preceded by: Eugenio Aguilar
- Succeeded by: Ramón Rodríguez (acting)

27th President of the Legislative Assembly of El Salvador
- In office 15 January 1872 – 1 April 1872
- Preceded by: Rafael Campo
- Succeeded by: José Dolores Larreynaga

Personal details
- Born: Doroteo Vasconcelos Valle; 6 February 1803 Sensuntepeque, San Salvador, New Spain
- Died: 10 March 1883 (aged 80) San Vicente, El Salvador
- Party: Liberal
- Occupation: Politician

Doroteo Vasconcelos Valle (6 February 1803 – 10 March 1883) was a Salvadoran politician who served as the 5th President of El Salvador from 1848 to 1851. Vasconcelos was a close friend of the Honduran general Francisco Morazán. He attempted to invade Guatemala and defeat General Rafael Carrera at the Battle of La Arada on 2 February 1851, but he was decisively defeated. Following this defeat, he retired from public life.

== Biography ==
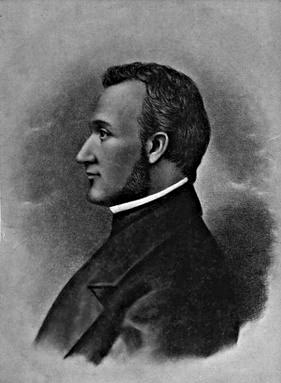
General Francisco Morazán, Vasconcelos' close friend.

Doroteo Vasconcelos Valle was born on 6 February 1803 in Sensuntepeque, San Salvador, New Spain. His parents were Manuel de Jesús Vasconcelos de Iraheta and Gertudis Valle.

=== Helping Los Altos ===
In 1848, the liberals were able to force Rafael Carrera to leave office, after the country had been in turmoil for several months. Carrera resigned at his own free will and left for México. The new liberal regime passed a law where they emphatically ordered to execute Carrera if he dared to return to Guatemalan soil. On his absence, the liberal criollos from Quetzaltenango -led by general Agustín Guzmán who occupied the city after Corregidor general Mariano Paredes was called to Guatemala City to take over the Presidential office- declared that Los Altos was an independent state once again on 26 August 1848; that had the support of Vasconcelos' regime in El Salvador and the rebel guerrilla army of Vicente and Serapio Cruz who were declared enemies of general Carrera. The interim government was led by Guzmán himself and had Florencio Molina and priest Fernando Davila as his Cabinet members. On 5 September 1848, the criollos altenses chose a formal government led by Fernando Antonio Martínez.

In the meantime, Carrera decided to return to Guatemala and did so entering by Huehuetenango, where he met with the native leaders and told them that they must unite to prevail; the leaders agreed and slowly the segregated native communities started developing a new Indian identity under Carrera's leadership. In the meantime, on the oriental part of Guatemala, the Jalapa region became increasingly dangerous; former president Mariano Rivera Paz and rebel leader Vicente Cruz were both murdered there after trying to take over the Corregidor office in 1849.

When Carrera arrived to Chiantla in Huehuetenango, he received two altenses emissaries who told him that their soldiers were not going to fight his forces because that would lead to a native revolt, much like the one that happened in 1840; their only request from Carrera was to keep the natives under control. However, the altenses did not comply with their offer, and led by Guzmán and his forces, they started chasing Carrera; the caudillo's

On his absence, the liberal criollos from Quetzaltenango -led by general Agustín Guzmán who occupied the city after Corregidor general Mariano Paredes was called to Guatemala City to take over the Presidential office- declared that Los Altos was an independent state once again on 26 August 1848; the new state had the support of Vasconcelos' regime in El Salvador and the rebel guerrilla army of Vicente and Serapio Cruz who were declared enemies of general Carrera. The interim government was led by Guzmán himself and had Florencio Molina and priest Fernando Davila as his Cabinet members. On 5 September 1848, the criollos altenses chose a formal government led by Fernando Antonio Martínez. In the meantime, Carrera decided to return to Guatemala and did so entering by Huehuetenango, where he met with the native leaders and told them that they had to remain united to prevail; the leaders agreed and slowly the segregated native communities started developing a new Indian identity under Carrera's leadership. In the meantime, on the eastern part of Guatemala, the Jalapa region became increasingly dangerous; former president Mariano Rivera Paz and rebel leader Vicente Cruz were both murdered there after trying to take over the Corregidor office in 1849.

Upon learning that officer José Víctor Zavala had been appointed as Corregidor in Suchitepéquez, Carrera and his hundred jacalteco bodyguards crossed a dangerous jungle infested with jaguars to meet his former friend. When they met, Zavala not only did not capture him, but agreed to serve under his orders, thus sending a strong message to both liberal and conservatives in Guatemala City, that realized that they were forced to negotiate with Carrera, otherwise they were going to have to battle on two fronts -Quetzaltenango and Jalapa. Carrera went back to the Quetzaltenango area, while Zavala remained in Suchitepéquez as a tactical maneuver. Carrera received a visit from a Cabinet member of Paredes and told him that he had control of the native population and that he assured Paredes that he will keep them appeased. When the emissary returned to Guatemala City, he told the president everything Carrera said, and added that the native forces were formidable.

Agustín Guzmán went to Antigua Guatemala to meet with another group of Paredes emissaries; they agreed that Los Altos would rejoin Guatemala, and that the latter would help Guzmán defeat his hated enemy and also build a port on the Pacific Ocean. Guzmán was sure of victory this time, but his plan evaporated when, in his absence, Carrera and his native allies had occupied Quetzaltenango; Carrera appointed Ignacio Yrigoyen as Corregidor and convinced him that he should work with the k'iche', mam, q'anjobal and mam leaders to keep the region under control. On his way out, Yrigoyen murmured to a friend: Now he is the King of the Indians, indeed!

Guzmán then left for Jalapa, where he stroke a deal with the rebels, while Luis Batres Juarros convinced president Paredes to deal with Carrera; Guzmán could only get a temporary truce from the revolt leaders León Raymundo, Roberto Reyes and Agustín Pérez; however, the truce was short lived, as the rebels sacked Jalapa on June 3 and 4. Guzmán then left for El Salvador, where after a while he issued a note to the rest of liberal leaders in Central America in which he attacked the immorality and viciousness of the savage Rafael Carrera, who -according to Guzmán- had not governed Guatemala properly in the last nine years. In his note, Guzmán told that he had gone to El Salvador to retire from public life, but that he could not remain impassible watching how Guatemala was returning to Carrera's rule and saying that with the help of El Salvador, Honduras, Nicaragua and the reborn Los Altos he was going to confront Carrera and return to a Federal Government; he practically assured that he was Morazán's successor trying to get rid of Carrera, but his note did not gather any support and Carrera returned to power in Guatemala.

=== Reelection ===
Vasconcelos finished his term in office and handed power to Ramón Rodríguez, who after only a few days give the power back to Vasconcelos for another 2-year term. During his time in office, he ordered the remains of Morazán to be returned to El Salvador, where he buried his old leader with State honors. After the liberal defeat of Los Altos and the return of Carrera as Guatemala's strong man, Vasconcelos gave asylum to all the Guatemalan liberales that had been exiled from their country, which led to increased tension between El Salvador y Guatemala.

=== Battle of La Arada ===
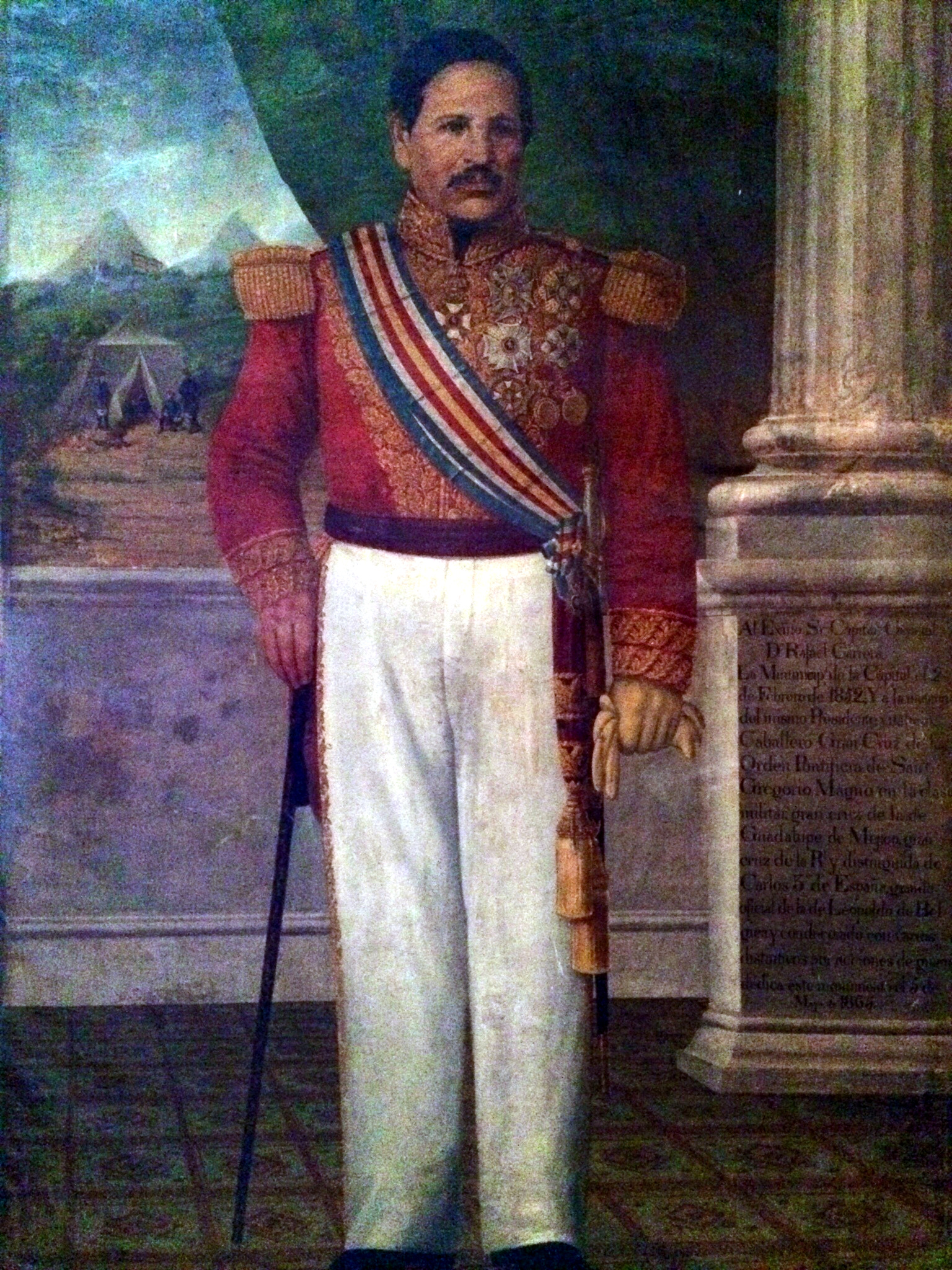
Captain General Rafael Carrera, defeated Vasconcelos in Battle of La Arada.

After Rafael Carrera returned from exile in 1849, Vasconcelos granted asylum to the Guatemalan liberals, who harassed the Guatemalan government in several different forms: José Francisco Barrundia did it through a liberal newspaper that had been established with that specific goal; Vasconcelos gave support during a whole year to a rebel faction "La Montaña", in eastern Guatemala, providing and distributing money and weapons. By late 1850, Vasconcelos was getting impatient due to the slowness of the progress of the war with Guatemala and decided to plan an open attack. Under that circumstance, the Salvadorean head of state started a campaign against the conservative Guatemalan regime, inviting Honduras and Nicaragua to participate in the alliance; only the Honduran government led by Juan Lindo accepted.

Meanwhile, in Guatemala, where the invasion plans were perfectly well-known, President Mariano Paredes started taking precautions to face the situation, while the Guatemalan Archbishop, Francisco de Paula García Peláez, ordered peace prayers in the archdiocese. (Note: Woodward 1993, p.: In the Conservative regime of Guatemala, the Catholic Church was entangled with the Government and the leaders of both were relatives, mostly of the Aycinena family.)

On 4 January 1851, Vasconcelos and Lindo met in Ocotepeque, Honduras, where they signed an alliance against Guatemala. The Salvadorean army had 4,000 men, properly trained and armed and supported by artillery; the Honduran army numbered 2,000 men. The coalition army was stationed in Metapán, El Salvador, due to its proximity with both the Guatemalan and Honduran borders.

On 28 January 1851, Vasconcelos sent a letter to the Guatemalan Ministry of Foreign Relations, in which he demanded that the Guatemalan president relinquish power, so that the alliance could designate a new head of state loyal to the liberals and that Rafael Carrera be exiled, escorted to any of the Guatemalan southern ports by a Salvadorean regiment. The Guatemalan government did not accept the terms and the Allied army entered Guatemalan territory at three different places. On 29 January, a 500-man contingent entered through Piñuelas, Agua Blanca and Jutiapa, led by General Vicente Baquero, but the majority of the invading force marched from Metapán. The Allied army was composed of 4,500 men led by Vasconcelos, as Commander in Chief. Other commanders were general José Santos Guardiola, general Ramón Belloso, general José Trinidad Cabañas, and general Gerardo Barrios. Guatemala was able to recruit 2,000 men, led by Lieutenant General Rafael Carrera as Commander in Chief and several colonels.

Carrera's strategy was to feign a retreat, forcing the enemy forces to follow the "retreating" troops to a place he had previously chosen; on February 1, 1851, both armies were facing each other with only the San José river between them. Carrera had fortified the foothills of La Arada, its summit about 50 metres (160 ft) above the level of the river. A meadow 300 metres (980 ft) deep lay between the hill and the river, and boarding the meadow was a sugar cane plantation. Carrera divided his army in three sections: the left wing was led by Cerna and Solares; the right wing led by Bolaños. He personally led the central battalion, where he placed his artillery. Five hundred men stayed in Chiquimula to defend the city and to aid in a possible retreat, leaving only 1,500 Guatemalans against an enemy of 4,500.

The battle began at 8:30 AM, when Allied troops initiated an attack at three different points, with an intense fire opened by both armies. The first Allied attack was repelled by the defenders of the foothill; during the second attack, the Allied troops were able to take the first line of trenches. They were subsequently expelled. During the third attack, the Allied force advanced to a point where it was impossible to distinguish between Guatemalan and Allied troops. Then, the fight became a melee, while the Guatemalan artillery severely punished the invaders. At the height of the battle when the Guatemalans faced an uncertain fate, Carrera ordered that sugar cane plantation around the meadow to be set on fire. The invading army was now surrounded: to the front, they faced the furious Guatemalan fire, to the flanks, a huge fire and to the rear, the river, all of which made retreat very difficult. The central division of the Allied force panicked and started a disorderly retreat. Soon, all of the Allied troops started retreating.

The 500 men of the rearguard pursued what was left of the Allied army, which desperately fled for the borders of their respective countries. The final count of the Allied losses were 528 dead, 200 prisoners, 1,000 rifles, 13,000 rounds of ammunition, many pack animals and baggage, 11 drums and seven artillery pieces. Vasconcelos sought refuge in El Salvador, while two Generals mounted on the same horse were seen crossing the Honduran border. Carrera regrouped his army and crossed the Salvadorean border, occupying Santa Ana, before he received orders from the Guatemalan President, Mariano Paredes, to return to Guatemala, since the Allies were requesting a cease-fire and a peace treaty.

After this terrible defeat, Vasconcelos retired from both the presidency and public life.

== Bibliography ==
- Aycinena, Pedro de (1854). Concordato entre la Santa Sede y el presidente de la República de Guatemala (in Latin and Spanish). Guatemala: Imprenta La Paz.
- González Davison, Fernando (2008). La montaña infinita; Carrera, caudillo de Guatemala (in Spanish). Guatemala: Artemis y Edinter. ISBN 978-84-89452-81-7.
- Hernández de León, Federico (1930). El libro de las efemérides Tomo III (in Spanish). Guatemala: Tipografía Sánchez y de Guise.
- Mi Chiquimula (n.d.). "Chiquimultecos conmemoran la batalla de La Arada". Mi Chiquimula (in Spanish). Archived from the original on 20 January 2015.
- Leistenschneider, María & Leistenschneider, Freddy (1980). Gobernantes de El Salvador: Biografías [Governors of El Salvador: Biographies] (in Spanish). Ministry of the Interior. OCLC 7876291.
- Rafael, Gerardo (1 February 2013). "Ejército conmemorará la Batalla de la Arada". Diario de Centro América (in Spanish). Archived from the original on 20 August 2013.
- Sierra González, Aida Lucila (2001). "La batalla de la Arada" (PDF). Servicio de Historia Militar, Sección de Investigaciones Históricas. Guatemala: Museo Militar. Archived from the original (PDF) on 21 December 2014.
- Woodward, Ralph Lee Jr. (1993). Rafael Carrera and the Emergence of the Republic of Guatemala, 1821-1871 (Online edition). Athens, Georgia EE.UU.: University of Georgia Press.

== Notes ==
Political offices
Preceded by José Félix Quirós (acting)	President of El Salvador; 1848–1850	Succeeded by Ramón Rodríguez (acting)
Preceded by José Félix Quirós (acting)	President of El Salvador; 1850–1851	Succeeded by Francisco Dueñas (acting)
Preceded by Rafael Campo	President of the Legislative Assembly of El Salvador; 1872	Succeeded by José Dolores Larreynaga Ayala
