= Gloria Salguero Gross =

Salvadoran politician and businesswoman (1941–2015)

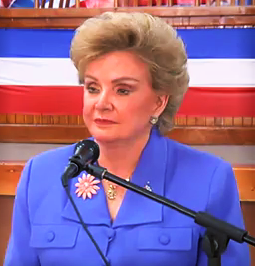
- Salguero Gross in 2012

President of the Legislative Assembly of El Salvador
- In office 1 May 1994 – 1 May 1997
- Preceded by: Luis Roberto Angulo Samayoa
- Succeeded by: Francisco Flores

Personal details
- Born: Mercedes Gloria Salguero Gross; 24 September 1941 Santa Ana, El Salvador
- Died: 1 November 2015 (aged 74) Santa Ana, El Salvador
- Party: ARENA
- Occupation: Businesswoman; Politician

Mercedes Gloria Salguero Gross (24 September 1941 – 1 November 2015) was a Salvadoran politician, businesswoman, and one of the founders of the Nationalist Republican Alliance (ARENA). She served as the President of the Legislative Assembly of El Salvador from 1994 to 1997.

== Biography ==
=== Personal life and family ===
Salguero Gross was the daughter of Miguel Ángel Salguero and Victoria Carolina Gross de Salguero, landowners with investments in agriculture and livestock; the latter was of German Jewish ancestry and worked both as a landowner and a lawyer.

=== Education ===
She completed her primary and secondary school studies at the Colegio La Asunción in Santa Ana and San Salvador. She studied Economics at Central American University "José Simeón Cañas". In Europe, she studied world history, geography, literature, and art in Switzerland, France, and the United Kingdom. She spoke Spanish, English, German, and French.

=== Political career ===
Salguero Gross was the second female President of the Legislative Assembly, but was the first to serve a full term from 1994 to 1997, since María Julia Castillo Rodas, of the National Coalition Party, was the first woman to serve in this office in the history of the country between 1983 and 1985, but did not serve a full term. Later, Salguero Gross was named Presidential Commissioner for the Democratic Governance from 2004 to 2009.

She began her political career as a Deputy for the Legislative Assembly of El Salvador in 1982, where she was a constituent deputy from 1982 to 1983, serving in the Office of the Secretary of the Board of Directors when the Constituent Assembly wrote the Constitution of the Republic of El Salvador. In addition, she integrated the commission to draft the Constitution and was highlighted as one of the people to contribute many ideas at the time the articles of the Constitution were drafted. From 1988 to 1991 she served as the Secretary of the Board of Directors. She was the Secretary of the Legislative Assembly in the time from 1991 to 1994, and a member of the National Commission for the Consolidation of Peace from 1992 to 1994.

She served as President of the National Executive Council (COENA) from 1991 to 1995, was President of ARENA from 1995 to 1997, and subsequently became President of the Foundation for Democracy, Peace, Progress, and Liberty (FUNDEPAL) from 1997 to 2001,

In 2001, she resigned from ARENA, where she had been serving as a proprietary deputy, due to differences with the national executive advisor of the party. She went on to establish another party, the Republican People's Party (PPR). After an absence of nearly 3 years, she returned to ARENA to support the president of COENA, José Antonio Salaverria, along with the presidential candidate at that time, Elías Antonio Saca.

Salguero Gross also served as the Vice President of the Latin American Parliament (1994–1997), the Deputy of the Central American Parliament (2001–2006), and the Presidential Commissioner for Democratic Governance (2004–2009). Additionally, as Designee to the Presidency of the Republic, she became the Coordinator for the National Commission for Local Development (CONADEL) and Coordinator for the National Commission of Labor Development (CONAMOL). Further, she acted as Coordinator of the Permanent Round Table for Dialogue and Understanding during the presidential term of Elías Antonio Saca.

On 11 June 2010, Salguero Gross was officially recognized by the Legislative Assembly with a national honour when she was declared a "Hija Meritísima de El Salvador" ("Meritorious Daughter of El Salvador") in recognition of extensive political career, which spanned more than three decades.

== Death ==
Salguero Gross died from cardiac arrest at a hospital in Santa Ana, El Salvador, on 1 November 2015, at the age of 74. Her funeral was held at Iglesia Santa Lucía, and she was buried in Santa Isabel cemetery.
