= Ramón Rodríguez (Salvadoran politician) =

President of El Salvador in 1850

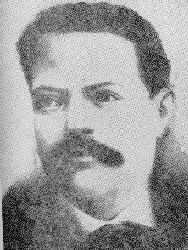

President of El Salvador
- In office 26 January 1850 – 1 February 1850; Acting President
- Vice President: Vacant
- Preceded by: Doroteo Vasconcelos
- Succeeded by: José Félix Quirós (acting)

Personal details
- Born: San Vicente, San Salvador, New Spain
- Occupation: Politician

Ramón Rodríguez was a Salvadoran politician who was President of El Salvador for six days in early 1850.

== Biography ==
Ramón Rodríguez was born in San Vicente, San Salvador, New Spain. He was a member of the Senate of El Salvador.

Rodríguez became acting President of El Salvador on 26 January 1850 when President Doroteo Vasconcelos handed him the presidency to avoid accusations of him influencing his re-election in the 1850 presidential election. The election resulted in Vasconcelos' re-election by the Senate. Rodríguez handed the acting presidency to Vice President-elect José Félix Quirós on 1 February, and Quirós handed the presidency to Vasconcelos on 4 February.

Political offices
Preceded by Doroteo Vasconcelos	President of El Salvador (acting); 1850	Succeeded by José Félix Quirós (acting)
