= José Bernardo Escobar =

President of Guatemala (1848–1849)

3rd President of Guatemala
- In office 28 November 1848 – 1 January 1849
- Preceded by: Juan Antonio Martínez
- Succeeded by: Mariano Paredes

Personal details
- Born: 20 October 1797 Jocotán, New Spain (now Guatemala)
- Died: 20 March 1849 (aged 51) El Salvador
- Party: Conservative party

José Bernardo Escobar (20 October 1797 - 20 March 1849) was interim President of Guatemala from 28 November 1848 to 1 January 1849. Escobar assumed duties when Juan Antonio Martínez was unable to maintain peace and resigned. Escobar took office only to meet instant opposition from both the Moderate party and the aristocrats and clergy.

Political offices
Preceded by Juan Antonio Martínez (Interim)	President of Guatemala; 1848-1849 (Interim)	Succeeded by Mariano Peredes (Interim)
