= José Dolores Larreynaga Ayala =

Salvadoran politician

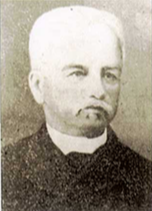

President of the Legislative Assembly of El Salvador
- In office 13 February 1888 – 7 April 1888
- Preceded by: José Valle Rodríguez
- Succeeded by: José Rocas Pacas Pineda
- In office 25 September 1872 – 18 October 1873
- Preceded by: Doroteo Vasconcelos
- Succeeded by: Dositeo Fallos

Personal details
- Born: 5 December 1828 Sensuntepeque, El Salvador, Federal Republic of Central America
- Died: 29 June 1894 (aged 65)
- Party: Liberal
- Occupation: Politician

José Dolores Larreynaga Ayala (5 December 1828 – 29 June 1894) was a Salvadoran politician who served as President of the Legislative Assembly of El Salvador from 1872 to 1873 and again in 1888.

== Biography ==
José Dolores Larreynaga Ayala was born on 5 December 1828 in Sensuntepeque, then in the Federal Republic of Central America. His father was Felipe Larreynaga and his mother was Francisca Ayala. He married Matías Trujillo in 1856, with whom he had 8 children. He is listed in the Mason Supreme Counsil of Central America in Guatemala, reaching 30th grade.

== Political career ==
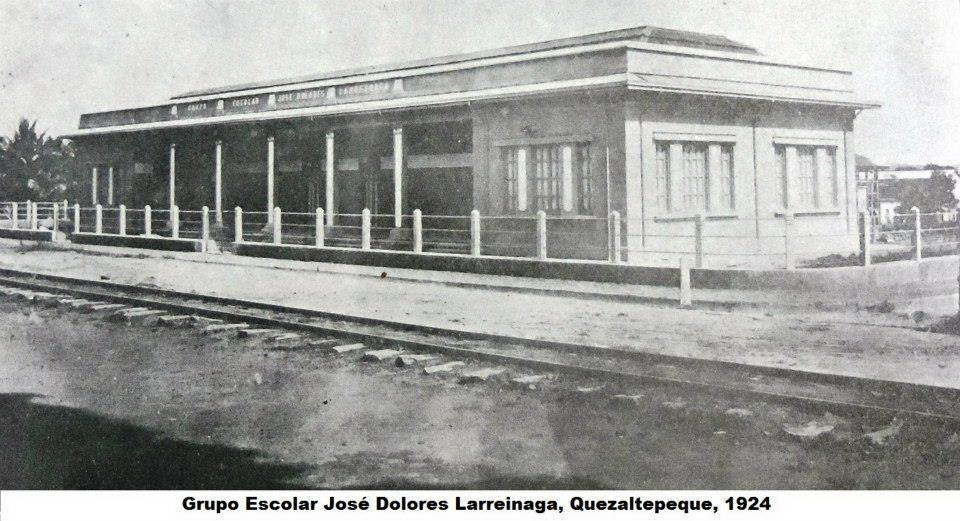
School built in honor of José Dolores Larreynaga Ayala.

José Dolores started his political career in 1861 when he was elected congressman. In 1871 Larreynaga Ayala was Governor of the state of San Salvador. During the Santiago Gonzalez presidency 1872, he was Interior Minister. He also was the Mayor of Santa Tecla in 1882. He served as President of the Legislative Assembly of El Salvador from 25 September 1872 to 18 October 1873. He served again from 13 February 1888 to 7 April 1888. During the Francisco Menéndez presidency in 1887, he was Minister of War and Interior. During the Carlos Ezeta administration, he also held the office of Cabinet Minister.

He died on 29 June 1894, in Santa Tecla.
