= Enrique Hoyos =

Salvadoran writer, journalist, lawyer and politician

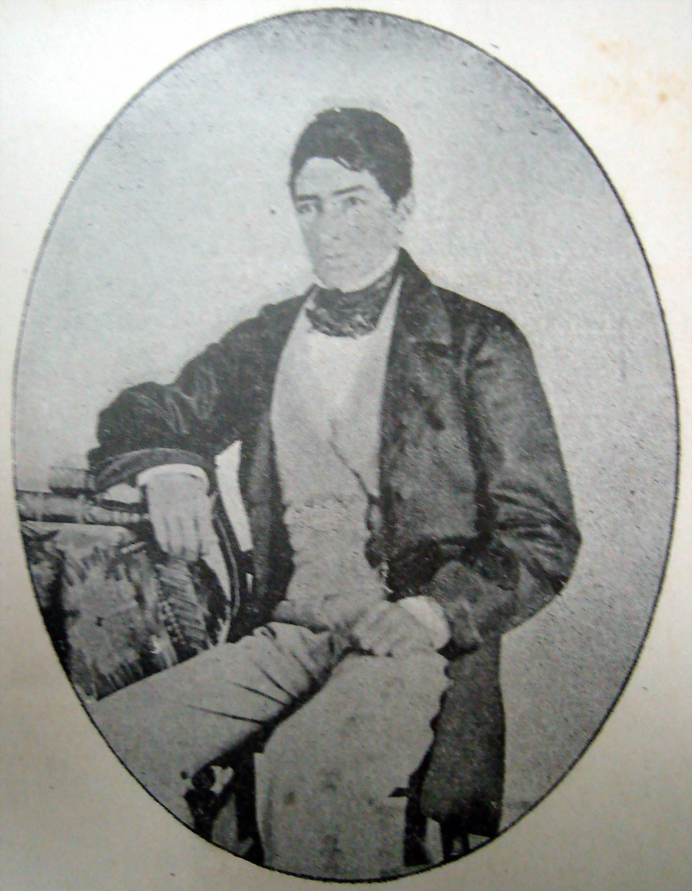

President of the Legislative Assembly of El Salvador
- In office 26 October 1841 – 6 November 1841
- Preceded by: Office Established
- Succeeded by: José María Cornejo

Minister of Foreign Affairs

Judge General of Hacienda

Deputy to the Legislature of the State

Personal details
- Born: 15 July 1810 Ilobasco, Captaincy General of Guatemala
- Died: 12 November 1859 (aged 49) Cojutepeque, Republic of El Salvador
- Cause of death: Dysentery
- Spouse: María Lorenza Molina y Lara
- Parent(s): Juan Antonio de Hoyos, Francisca Úrsula de Torres
- Occupation: Writer, politician, journalist, lawyer

Enrique Hoyos (15 July 1810 – 12 November 1859) was a Salvadoran lawyer, politician, journalist and writer in the classicist and romanticist fields.

== Early life ==
Born in Ilobasco on 15 July 1810 he was the son of Doña Francisca Úrsula de Hoyos. He remained in Ilobasco under the care of Doña Carmen Ecamilla, in whose house he was born. When he was 10 years old, him and his immediate relatives moved to San Vicente, where he finished his primary education and began to study Latin.

In 1823, the Hoyos family moved to Guatemala where he continued his studies in Latin and took courses in philosophy. In 1829 he moved to Havana where he was page for Archbishop Casaus. There he began to study for the priesthood to please his aunt, doña Josefa Hoyos, who wanted him to embrace an ecclesiastical career. When he was about to receive holy orders, he wrote to his family asking them to return him to Guatemala, stating frankly and resolutely that he did not wish to be ordained. Given this, his family returned in 1831.

== Literary and political career ==
=== Return to El Salvador ===
Back in Guatemala, he began his law studies and graduated with a bachelor's degree. He interrupted his internship to move to San Vicente with his uncle José María López. In 1836, he married Lorenza Molina, from one of the first families of San Vicente. Shortly after his marriage, he moved to San Salvador, where he worked as deputy chief of the Federal Ministry of Finance.

=== Positions held ===
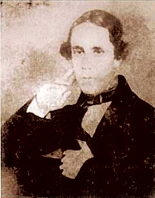
Official Portrait of Hoyos when he was President of the Legislative Assembly.

In early 1841, he became a lawyer and soon after he was appointed adviser to the Department of Cuscatlán. At that time, he dedicated himself to services alternately in the judicial and political and governmental branches. For some time he was Finance Judge, First Instance Judge of the Department of Cuscatlán, Minister of Foreign Affairs and Deputy to the Legislature of the State.

He was very prominent in the social, literary and political life. He served as minister of foreign affairs, was a congressman, first instance judge, and professor at the National University. He was the president of the Legislative Assembly of El Salvador from 26 October to 6 November 1841. In 1845 he published his book "Apóstrofes". In September 1849, he discovered a stone coal mine in the vicinity of Ilobasco and in Río de los Frailes, this mine was formally denounced and admitted by the finance judge of the department of Cuscatlán, Francisco Revelo, on 28 September of the same year.

By an agreement made on 21 February 1854 Hoyos was entrusted with writing the official government newspaper La Gaceta del Gobierno del Salvador en la América Central. He was later appointed as the Minister of Foreign Affairs.

At the dawn of 6 July 1856 Enrique Terrelonge, a resident of Cubulco, Guatemala, who had been given lodging, robbed Hoyos's house, stealing a horse, a mule, a steel scabbard sword with shots, three broken bridles, a saddle, a light blue Peruvian azalea, a silver plate, and a luxury dagger, all costing a total of 250 lost pesos.

He was appointed as a deputy for the National Congress that met in Tegucigalpa in 1852. A government agreement made by the Minister General, Irungaray, on 4 April 1859 left the editorial staff of the Gaceta del Salvador under Hoyos' charge and at the same time appointed him General Judge of the Treasury. When it was decreed that the Cloister of Counselors or Governing Board of the University of the Republic be replaced with a Council of Public Instruction on 6 September 1859, Hoyos was part of the council as First Counselor for the Science and Letters section.

== Death and legacy ==
Deathly ill, Hoyos resigned from the position of General Finance Judge and on 21 October the president appointed Nicaraguan author Tomás Ayón to take office. On the Saturday of 12 November, at seven in the morning, he died in Cojutepeque due to his long lasting dysentery, when he was barely 49 years old. According to the obituary article in the Official Gazette, his last words were: "My only and greatest friend in my last moments has been Señor Barrios", for the help he had provided for his recovery in Cojutepeque.

The central park and a main street in Ilobasco bear his name.

=== Works ===
He is notable for his book "Apóstrofes", and is considered one of El Salvador's first literary artists.

In the "Guirnalda Salvadoreña, Vol 1" published in 1884 some of his poems appear, including:

- Canto popular (A ella)
- Mi esperanza
- La constricción de un abogado
- Canción
- A Lorenza
- A Nice
- Soneto (Dedicated to Benemérito Colonel José A. Carvallo, who died during Malespín's War)

Political offices
Preceded by Position Created	President of the Legislative Assembly of El Salvador; 1841	Succeeded by José María Cornejo
