= Juan Antonio Martínez =

Guatemalan politician

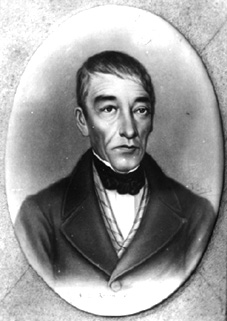

2nd President of Guatemala
- In office 16 August 1848 – 28 November 1848
- Preceded by: José Rafael Carrera Turcios
- Succeeded by: José Bernardo Escobar

Personal details
- Born: Unknown
- Died: April 30, 1854 Guatemala City, Guatemala
- Party: Conservative party

Juan Antonio Martínez was interim President of Guatemala from 16 August 1848 to 28 November 1848. Martinez was elected due to the resignation of President José Rafael Carrera Turcios on August 15, 1848.

The Liberal Party, expected at any time to take up arms against each other, elected Juan Martinez as a president because he had the qualities, they were looking for in liberal politicians. At first Mr. Martinez did not accept the position but finally was convinced. Being inexperienced in the realm of politics, the Martinez administration was a series of mistakes and deviations. As an expert banker on foreign currency, he handled the Guatemalan bank well.

Between August and November 27, 1848, when he presented his irrevocable resignation due to war and "dirty passions" of politicians. On April 30, 1854, Martinez died in Guatemala City.

Political offices
Preceded by José Rafael Carrera Turcios	President of Guatemala; 1848 (Interim)	Succeeded by José Bernardo Escobar (Interim)
