= José Víctor Zavala =

Guatemalan military officer

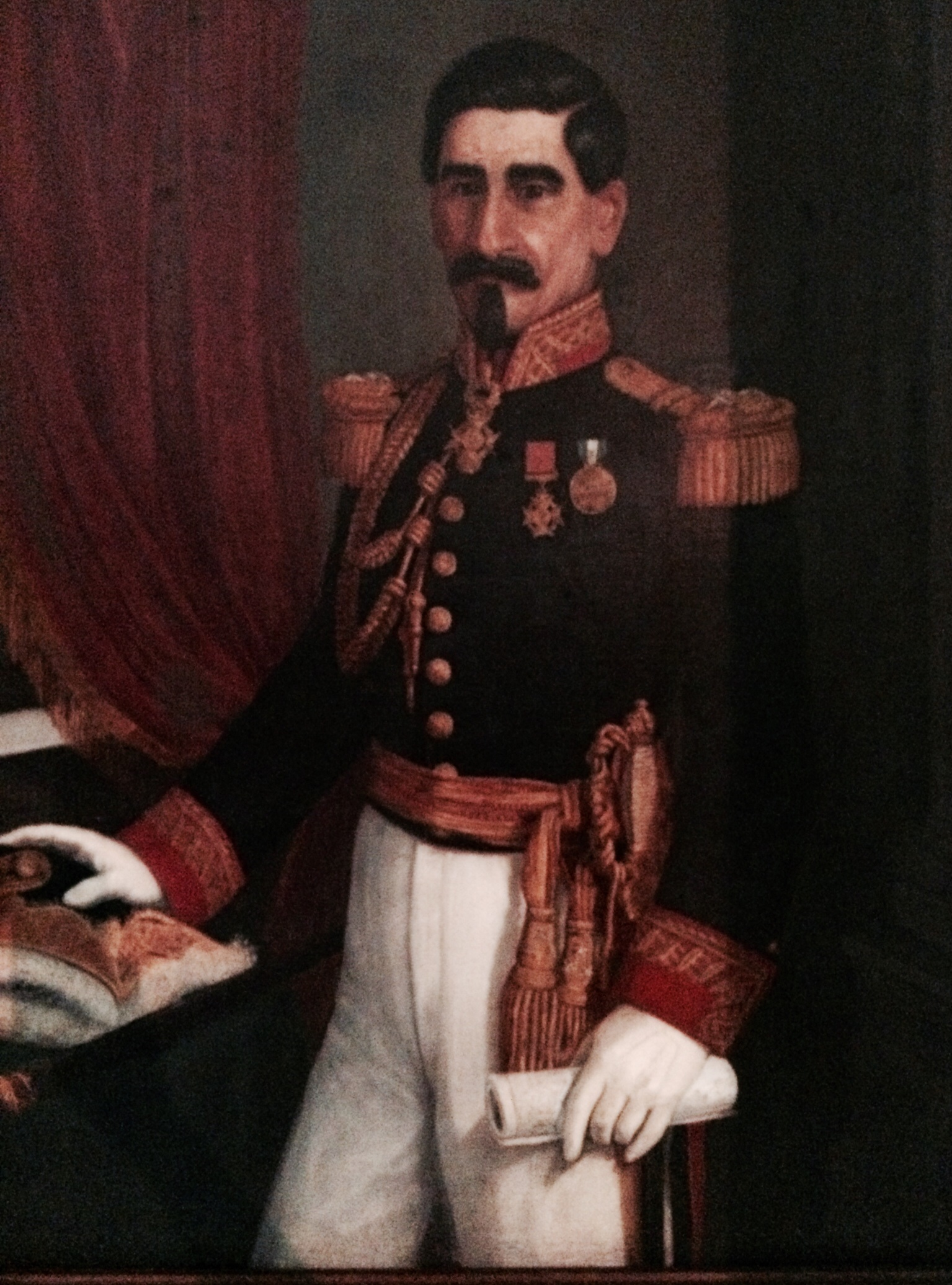
- Mariscal Zavala portrait
- Born: November 2, 1815; Guatemala City
- Died: March 26, 1886 (aged 70); Guatemala City
- Burial place: Guatemala City
- Military career
- Allegiance: Guatemala
- Branch: Guatemalan Conservative Army; Central America Unified Army; Guatemalan Army
- Service years: 1848–1885
- Rank: Field Marshal
- Conflicts: Battle of Patzún (1848); Battle of La Arada (1851); Battle of San Fernando de Omoa (1853); Filibuster War (1856); Battle of Coatepeque (1863); Battle of Chalchuapa (1885)

José Víctor Ramón Valentín de las Ánimas Zavala y Córdova (November 2, 1815 – March 26, 1886) was a Guatemalan Field Marshal who participated in the wars of Rafael Carrera and the National War of Nicaragua against the invasion of William Walker. After the death of President Carrera in April 1865, Zavala – who was a close friend of the late President – was proposed as the next president, but instead Field Marshal Vicente Cerna y Cerna was appointed. A military brigade headquarters in Guatemala City is named "Mariscal Zavala Brigade" in his honor.

== Biography ==
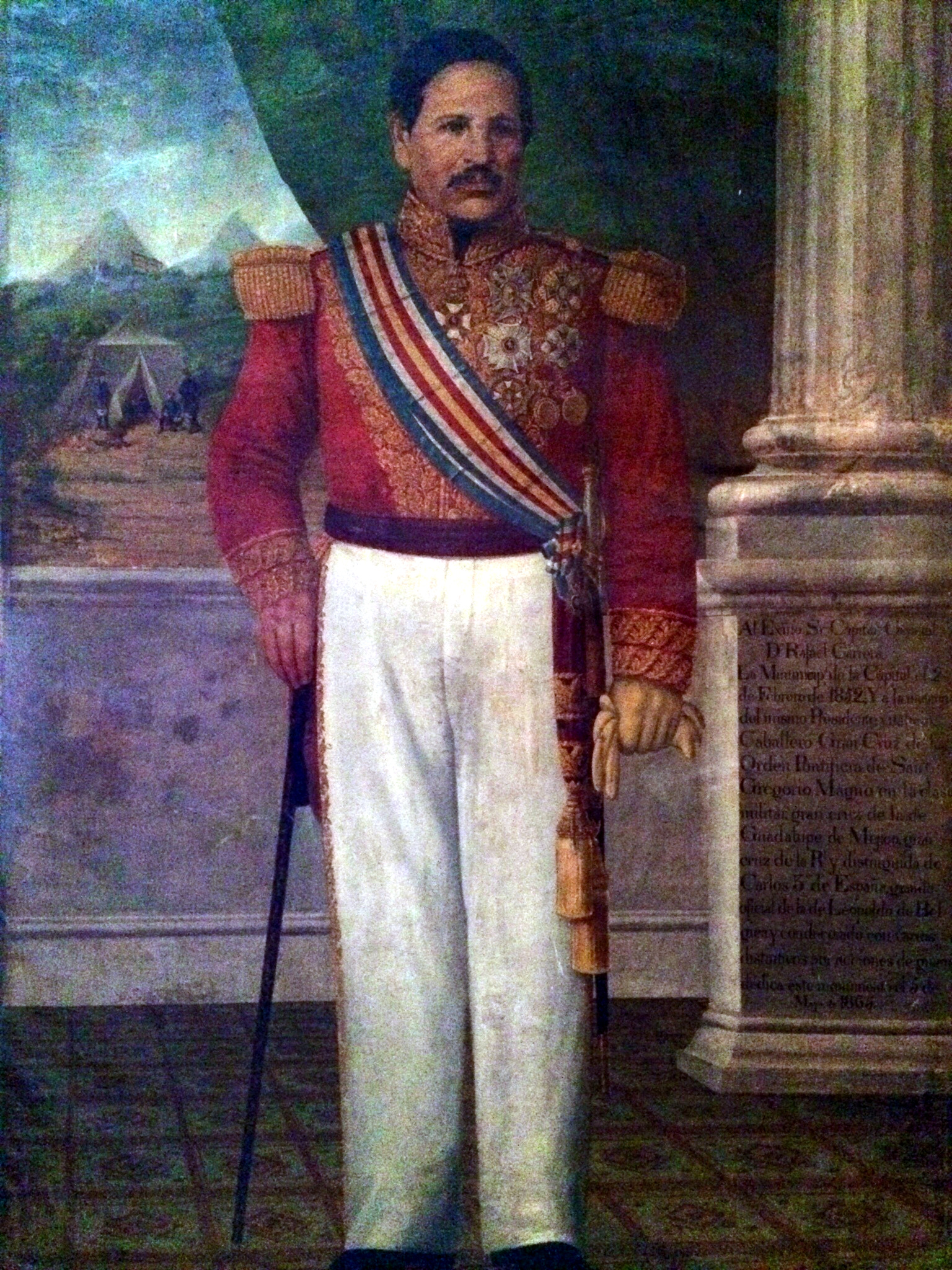
General Rafael Carrera. During his presidency (1840-1865) the then Sergeant Zavala was a loyal official of the Guatemalan Conservative Army.

Zavala y Córdoba was born in Guatemala City and was educated on sound moral principles that he would always hold in high esteem and were decisive for his formation, making him a good friend among those who knew him. While still very young, he was sent to the United States, where he received a broad education. His father wanted for him that upon his return to Guatemala he would become a lawyer at the Academy of Sciences of Guatemala; (Note: Name the University of San Carlos had at the time.) however, it did not work as his family had hoped because his character did not fit a law career.

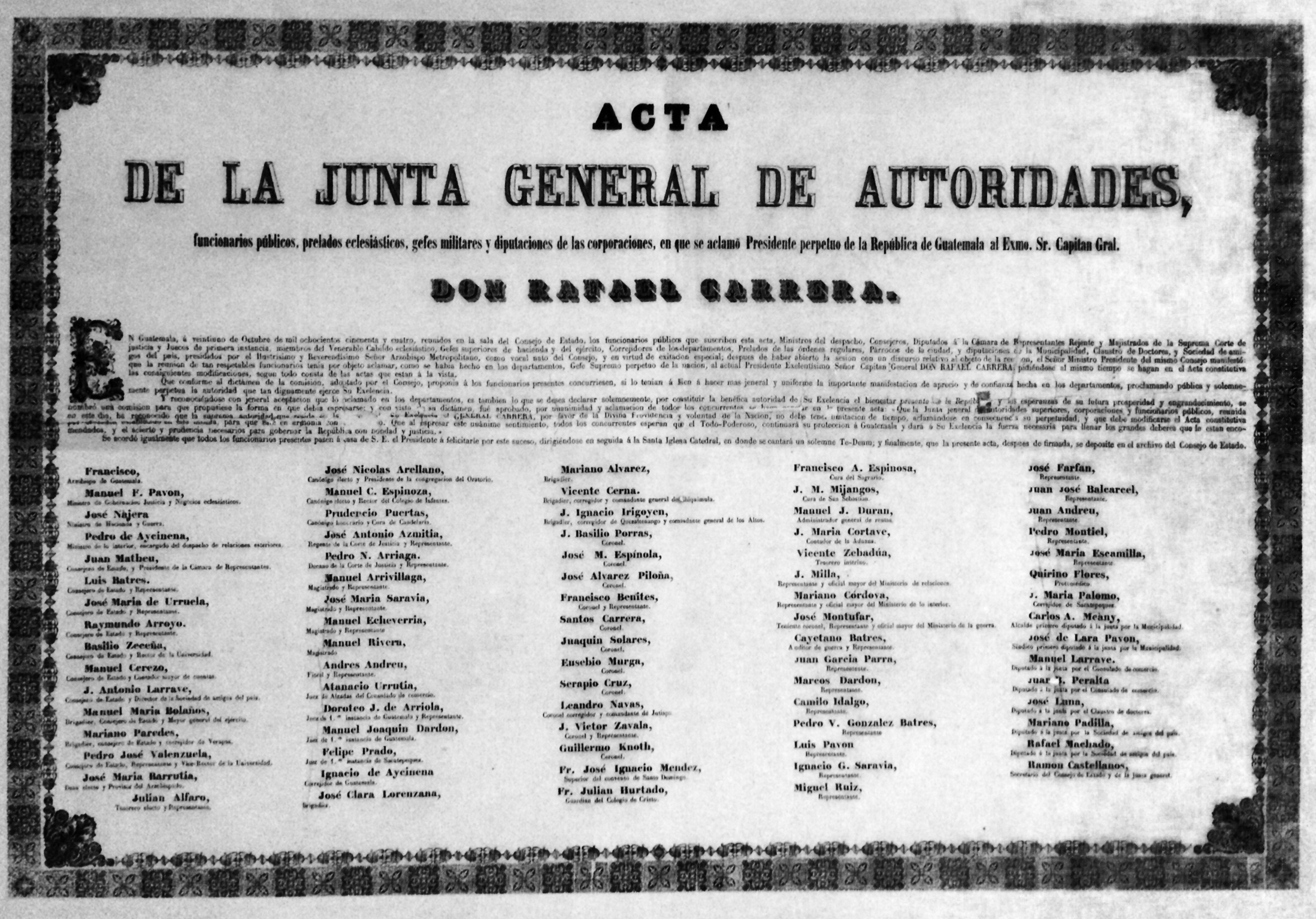
Decree that declares Captain General Rafael Carrera President for life; Zavala was one of the signatories. (Note: His signature is the third from the bottom up, in the third column.)

Zavala began his military career when he joined the Army to put out the peasant uprisings commanded by Rafael Carrera who -ironically- eventually would be his loyal collaborator and friend; likewise attended numerous expeditions, among which may be mentioned, fighting against Serapio Cruz in action Patzún in July 1848, also participated in the historic Battle of La Arada, on 2 February 1851 and subsequent action against Honduras in 1853, so he was considered as one of the winners of Fort San Fernando de Omoa. He fought under the command of race when he was appointed Commander in Chief Army of Guatemala (1844), and then life president of the country (1854-1865). In 1854, he was one of the signatories of the decision that declared life president General Rafael Carrera. A personal friend of Carrera, he was talking in French with José Carrera, the son of the president, right when Joseph returned to Guatemala after finishing his education in Europe, and shortly before Joseph died in his first bout at the port of Omoa in 1853.

=== War against William Walker ===
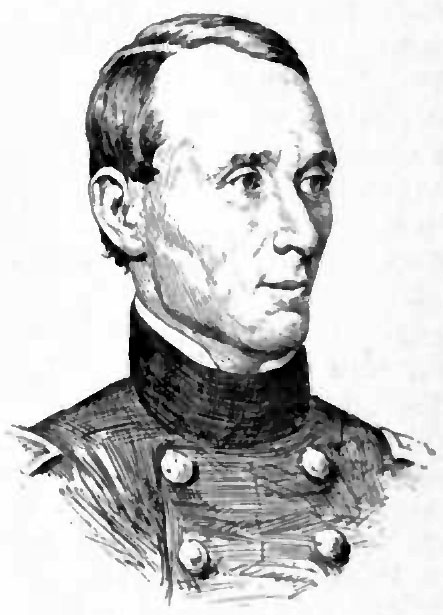
William Walker, American filibuster

Walker's flag of 19th century American-occupied Nicaragua

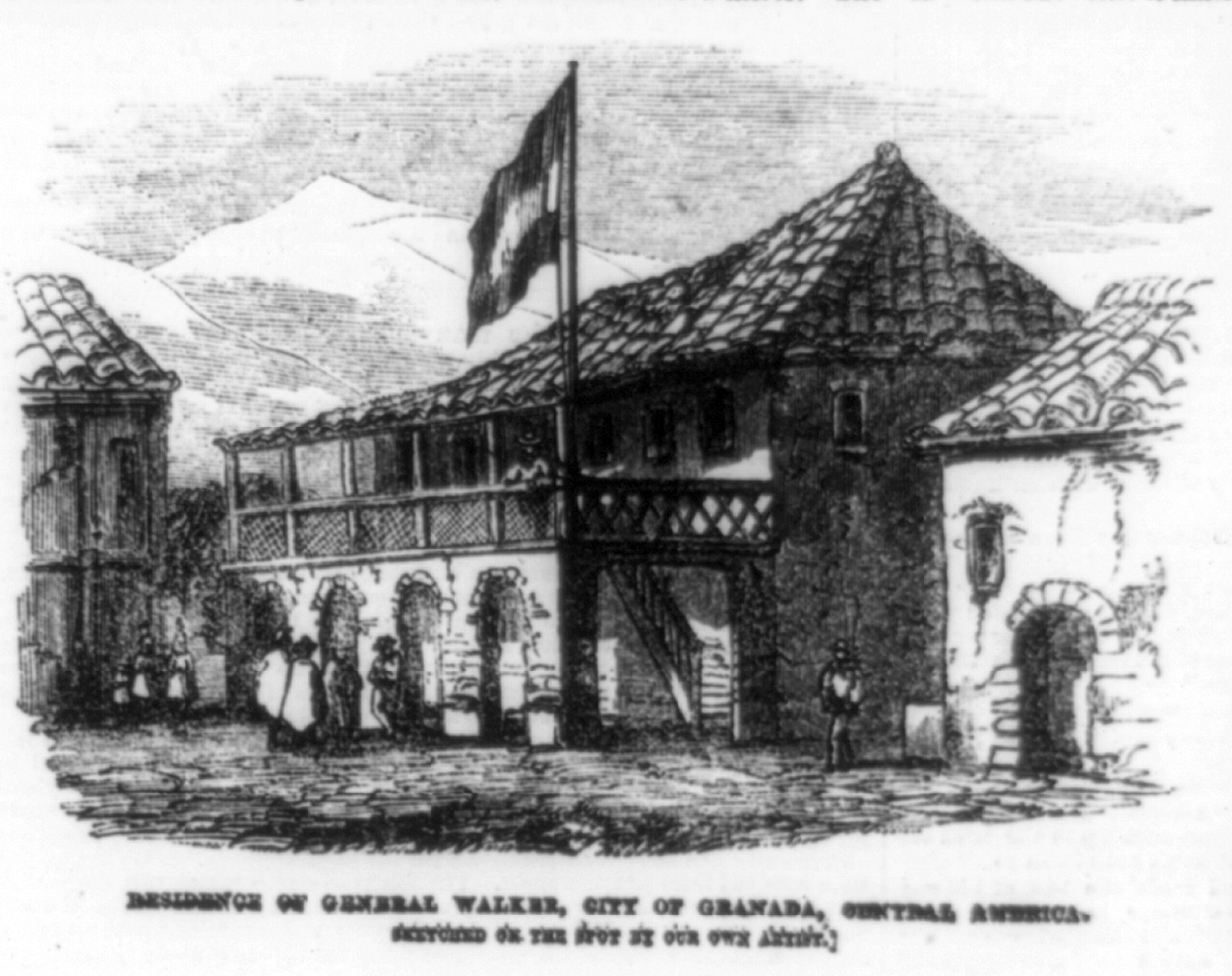
William Walker's house in Granada. On October 12, 1856, during the siege of Granada, Guatemalan officer Zavala ran under heavy fire to capture the flag and bring it back to the Central American coalition Army trenches shouting Filibuster bullets don't kill! Zavala came out of this adventure unscratched.

At the age of 42, he accomplished his greatest military achievement: still a Sergeant Major, Carrera sent him to Nicaragua in 1856 to participate in the National War of Nicaragua against William Walker as part of the Allied Army Central. He led his troops through Nicaraguan territory and then joined the column under General Mariano Paredes with whom he went to Cojutepeque, achieving a landslide victory. He commanded the contingent of Guatemala after the death of General Paredes, and as Lieutenant Colonel, who had been appointed commander of the Guatemalan forces by Carrera. Frederic Rosengarten Jr. named him as the "sliest" of the leaders who attended the campaign.

During the conflict came into contention with the general commander of the Allies, the Salvadoran Ramon Belloso. On October 12, 1856, during the destruction of Granada, Zavala performed an act of courage: he crossed the square of the city to the house where the pirates took shelter; under heavy fire, he made it to the enemy's flag and carried it back with him. Once Walker surrendered, received the city of Rivas under his authority, on May 1, 1857. After the war was over, he returned home and six years later took part in an expedition against President of El Salvador, Gerardo Barrios. He was known as the "Guatemalan D'Artagnan". On his return from the campaign against the freebooters, Zavala was awarded a commemorative medal and the rank of Colonel Army. He continued serving under Captain General Rafael Carrera, with whom he reached the rank of Field Marshal.

=== Revolution of 1871 and the Liberal regimes ===
After the death of president for life Rafael Carrera on April 14, 1865, there was a period of political accommodation in Guatemala where it was thought that Marshal Zavala would be the new president. Instead, Marshal Vicente Cerna was appointed acting President and, finally, called for elections in January 1869. The Conservatives postulated Field Marshal Vicente Cerna, who had continued as Acting President; while the Liberals postulated Zavala. Under heavy allegations of fraud, Cerna won. A few weeks later, Field Marshal Serapio Cruz started a rebellion which ended with the victory of liberal forces led by Miguel García Granados and Justo Rufino Barrios in 1871. In the new government, served as deputy Secretary of War. During the Campaign for Central American Union in 1885 he was General Barrios Chief of Staff, serving at old age but held in high regard by his experience and education.

== Death ==
After general Barrios' death in Chalchuapa, Zavala retired from public life and died on March 26, 1886. His remains rest in the General Cemetery of Guatemala City.

== Bibliography ==
- Dueñas Van Severen, J. Ricardo (2006). La invasión filibustera de Nicaragua y la Guerra Nacional (in Spanish). Secretaría General del Sistema de la Integración Centroamericana SG-SICA.
- Fernández Molina, Luis (2013). "El mariscal Zavala". Diario La Hora (in Spanish). Guatemala.
- González Davison, Fernando (2008). La montaña infinita; Carrera, caudillo de Guatemala (in Spanish). Guatemala: Artemis y Edinter. ISBN 978-84-89452-81-7.
- Hernández de León, Federico (1930). El libro de las efemérides (in Spanish). Vol. Tomo III. Guatemala: Tipografía Sánchez y de Guise.
- Latin American Studies (n.d.). "Bandera cubana filibustera" (PDF). Latin American Studies.
- Museo Militar de Guatemala (n.d.). "Mariscal Zavala". Museo Militar de Guatemala (in Spanish). Guatemala: Ejército de Guatemala.
- Rosengarten, Frederic Jr. (1976). Freebooters must die!. USA: Haverford House, Publishers. ISBN 0-910702-01-2.
