= Eduardo Arriola Zelaya =

Salvadoran politician

Doctor Eduardo Arriola Zelaya
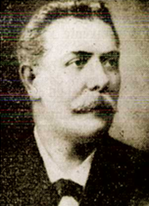

President of the Legislative Assembly of El Salvador
- In office 1900 – 26 August 1900
- President: Tomás Regalado
- Preceded by: Dionisio Aráuz
- Succeeded by: Ramón García González
- In office 15 February 1896 – 13 May 1896
- President: Rafael Antonio Gutiérrez
- Preceded by: Joaquin Medina Rodríguez
- Succeeded by: Dositeo Fallos

Deputy of the Legislative Assembly of El Salvador from San Salvador
- In office 1896–1896

Personal details
- Born: 13 October 1846 San Salvador, El Salvador
- Died: 26 August 1900 (aged 53) San Salvador, El Salvador
- Party: Liberal
- Profession: Politician

Eduardo Arriola Zelaya (13 October 1846 – 26 August 1900) was a Salvadoran politician who served as the President of the Legislative Assembly in 1896 and 1900.

== Early life ==
Eduardo Arriola Zelaya was born on 13 October 1846 in San Salvador, El Salvador His father was Dr. Doroteo José de Arriola and his mother was Mercedes Zelaya. He was baptized in the Catholic Church in Mexico City on 22 November 1846. He completed his doctorate at the University of El Salvador on 25 October 1872. He married Guadalupe Bustamante in 1880.

== Political career ==
He was appointed as Secretary and Minister of Governing and Agriculture in August 1878 by President Rafael Zaldívar. He was considered as an "outstanding mayor" by President Francisco Menéndez.

He became a deputy of the Legislative Assembly of El Salvador representing San Salvador in 1896. That same year, he became the President of the Legislative Assembly on 15 February. His term ended on 13 May 1896.

He became President of the Legislative Assembly again in 1900 and he died in office on 26 August 1900.
