= List of presidents of the Legislative Assembly of El Salvador =

Presiding officer of the legislature of El Salvador

The President of the Legislative Assembly of El Salvador is the presiding officer of the Legislative Assembly of El Salvador, the country's unicameral legislature.

While legislative leadership in El Salvador dates back to the federal era in 1822—first held by the independence leader José Matías Delgado as President of the Junta of Government—the modern office in its current form was established following the Constitution of 1886.

The President is elected by a majority of the 60 deputies (as of the 2024 reform) for a term of three years, coinciding with the legislative period. The current President is Ernesto Castro, who has held the office since 1 May 2021.

== List of presidents of the Legislative Assembly ==
President			Term of office			Session	Party	Ref.
President			Assumed office	Left office	Time in office	Session	Party	Ref.
President of the Junta of Government
1	José Matías Delgado	Presbyter; José Matías Delgado (1767–1832)	10 November 1822	5 December 1822	25 days	—	Independent	
President of the National Assembly
1	José Mariano Calderón	Presbyter; José Mariano Calderón (1774–1826)	14 March 1824	17 April 1824	34 days	1st Constituent	Independent	
2	Mariano Fagoaga	Mariano Fagoaga (es) (1767–1837)	17 April 1824	6 May 1824	19 days	1st Constituent	Independent	
3	Pablo María Sagastume	Presbyter; Pablo María Sagastume (?–1837)	16 May 1824	5 June 1824	20 days	1st Constituent	Independent	
4	Manuel Romero	Manuel Romero (?–?)	5 June 1824	13 June 1824	8 days	1st Constituent	Independent	
5	Joaquín de San Martín	Colonel; Joaquín de San Martín (1770–1854)	13 June 1824	30 July 1824	47 days	1st Constituent	Independent	
6	Benito González Martínez	Benito González Martínez (1776–1852)	30 July 1824	31 August 1824	32 days	1st Constituent	Independent	
7	Unknown officeholder	Unknown officeholder	31 August 1824	1 October 1824	31 days	1st Constituent	—	
8	Juan Manuel Rodríguez	Juan Manuel Rodríguez (1771–1847)	19 October 1824	30 October 1824	11 days	1st Constituent	Independent	
9	Miguel José de Castro y Lara	Presbyter; Miguel José de Castro y Lara (es) (1775–1829)	1 November 1824	24 November 1824	23 days	1st Constituent	Independent	
10	José Antonio Ximénez y Vasconcelos	José Antonio Ximénez (1791–1859)	30 January 1825	28 February 1825	29 days	1st Ordinary	Independent	
11	Juan José de Arce	Presbyter; Juan José de Arce (1759–1850)	28 February 1825	27 March 1825	27 days	1st Ordinary	Independent	
12	José Nereo Marín y Cañas	José Nereo Marín y Cañas (1799–1865)	27 March 1825	25 April 1825	29 days	1st Ordinary	Independent	
13	José María Cornejo	José María Cornejo (1788–1864)	13 January 1826	12 February 1826	30 days	2nd Ordinary	Conservative	
14	Miguel José de Castro y Lara	Presbyter; Miguel José de Castro y Lara (es) (1775–1829)	12 February 1826	7 March 1826	23 days	2nd Ordinary	Independent	
15	Mariano Antonio de Lara	Presbyter; Mariano Antonio de Lara (es) (1774–1843)	7 March 1826	13 April 1826	37 days	2nd Ordinary	Independent	
16	Francisco Gómez	Francisco Gómez (1796–1838)	18 October 1826	28 October 1826	10 days	2nd Ordinary	Independent	
17	José María Cornejo	José María Cornejo (1788–1864)	25 January 1827	22 February 1827	28 days	3rd Ordinary	Conservative	
18	Juan José Guzmán	Colonel; Juan José Guzmán (1797–1847)	22 February 1827	24 March 1827	30 days	3rd Ordinary	Conservative	
19	José León Taboada	Presbyter; José León Taboada (?–1863)	24 March 1827	24 April 1827	31 days	3rd Ordinary	Independent	
20	Juan José López y Burgos	Colonel; Juan José López y Burgos (1788–1861)	25 April 1827	22 May 1827	27 days	3rd Ordinary	Independent	
21	Joaquín Durán y Aguilar	Joaquín Durán y Aguilar (es) (1789–1877)	2 June 1827	1 July 1827	29 days	3rd Ordinary	Independent	
22	Damián Cisneros	Damián Cisneros (1776–1857)	10 July 1827	2 August 1827	23 days	3rd Ordinary	Independent	
23	José María Cornejo	José María Cornejo (1788–1864)	2 January 1828	20 January 1828	18 days	4th Ordinary	Conservative	
24	Mariano Funes	Mariano Funes (?–1837)	20 January 1828	9 February 1828	20 days	4th Ordinary	Independent	
25	Juan José Pineda y Saldaña	Juan José Pineda y Saldaña (1800–1878)	3 December 1828	3 January 1829	31 days	4th Ordinary	Independent	
26	José Enríquez y Nuila	José Enríquez y Nuila (?–?)	15 January 1829	24 February 1829	40 days	5th Ordinary	Independent	
27	Mariano Funes	Mariano Funes (?–1837)	24 February 1829	15 March 1829	19 days	5th Ordinary	Independent	
27	Mariano Funes	Mariano Funes (?–1837)	9 May 1829	13 June 1829	35 days	5th Ordinary	Independent	
27	Mariano Funes	Mariano Funes (?–1837)	22 August 1829	26 September 1829	35 days	5th Ordinary	Independent	
28	José Antonio Colom	Presbyter; José Antonio Colom (?–?)	28 November 1829	2 January 1830	35 days	5th Ordinary	Independent	
28	José Antonio Colom	Presbyter; José Antonio Colom (?–?)	2 January 1830	2 March 1830	59 days	6th Ordinary	Independent	
29	Pedro Garay	Pedro Garay (?–1837)	5 August 1830	4 September 1830	30 days	6th Ordinary	Independent	
30	Anselmo Paiz	Anselmo Paiz (es) (?–1875)	4 September 1830	28 October 1830	54 days	6th Ordinary	Independent	
31	José Antonio Ximénez y Vasconcelos	José Antonio Ximénez (1791–1859)	2 January 1831	2 February 1831	31 days	7th Ordinary	Independent	
32	Francisco González	Francisco González (1794–1832)	2 February 1831	16 March 1831	42 days	7th Ordinary	Independent	
33	Antonio José Cañas	Antonio José Cañas (1785–1844)	16 March 1831	2 April 1831	17 days	7th Ordinary	Independent	
34	Alejandro Molina y Lara	Alejandro Molina y Lara (1813–1892)	4 September 1831	1 October 1831	27 days	7th Ordinary	Independent	
35	Gerónimo Paiz	Gerónimo Paiz (?–?)	24 December 1831	1 January 1832	8 days	7th Ordinary	Independent	
36	Antonio José Cañas	Antonio José Cañas (1785–1844)	3 January 1832	3 February 1832	31 days	8th Ordinary	Independent	
37	Agustín Rivas	Agustín Rivas (?–1857)	3 February 1832	15 February 1832	12 days	8th Ordinary	Independent	
38	Francisco González	Francisco González (1794–1832)	20 March 1832	23 March 1832	3 days	8th Ordinary	Independent	
39	José Matías Delgado	Presbyter; José Matías Delgado (1767–1832)	13 May 1832	9 June 1832	27 days	9th Ordinary	Independent	
40	Domingo Fagoaga	Colonel; Domingo Fagoaga (1799–1870)	9 June 1832	13 July 1832	34 days	9th Ordinary	Independent	
41	Francisco Padilla	Francisco Padilla (?–1841)	13 July 1832	6 August 1832	24 days	9th Ordinary	Independent	
42	Domingo Antonio de Lara	Domingo Antonio de Lara (1783–1845)	6 August 1832	8 September 1832	33 days	9th Ordinary	Independent	
43	José Miguel Montoya	José Miguel Montoya (?–1875)	1 December 1832	18 December 1832	17 days	9th Ordinary	Independent	
44	José Antonio Murga	José Antonio Murga (1808–1876)	5 January 1833	9 February 1833	35 days	10th Ordinary	Independent	
45	José Marcelo Avilés	Presbyter; José Marcelo Avilés (1770–1837)	27 June 1833	31 July 1833	34 days	11th Ordinary	Independent	
46	José Dolores Castillo	Colonel; José Dolores Castillo (?–1834)	31 July 1833	25 August 1833	25 days	11th Ordinary	Independent	
47	José Miguel Alegría	José Miguel Alegría (1786–1859)	29 March 1834	20 April 1834	22 days	12th Ordinary	Independent	
48	Francisco Saldaña	Francisco Saldaña (?–1842)	20 April 1834	13 May 1834	23 days	12th Ordinary	Independent	
49	Unknown officeholder	Unknown officeholder	13 May 1834	31 May 1834	18 days	12th Ordinary	—	
50	José María Silva	José María Silva (1804–1876)	21 September 1834	17 October 1834	26 days	13th Ordinary	Independent	
51	Unknown officeholder	Unknown officeholder	17 October 1834	25 October 1834	8 days	13th Ordinary	—	
52	Juan José Guzmán	Colonel; Juan José Guzmán (1797–1847)	14 January 1835	13 February 1835	30 days	14th Ordinary	Conservative	
53	José Campo y Pomar	José Campo y Pomar (1806–1881)	13 February 1835	7 March 1835	22 days	14th Ordinary	Independent	
54	José Ignacio Saldaña	José Ignacio Saldaña (1791–1857)	7 March 1835	8 April 1835	32 days	14th Ordinary	Independent	
55	Mariano Antonio de Lara	Presbyter; Mariano Antonio de Lara (es) (1774–1843)	15 April 1835	8 May 1835	23 days	14th Ordinary	Independent	
56	José Damián Villacorta	José Damián Villacorta (1796–1860)	8 May 1835	22 May 1835	14 days	14th Ordinary	Independent	
57	Luis Ayala	Luis Ayala (1801–1883)	15 January 1836	21 February 1836	37 days	15th Ordinary	Independent	
58	Nicolás Angulo	General; Nicolás Angulo (1809–1879)	21 February 1836	30 March 1836	38 days	15th Ordinary	Independent	
59	Manuel Mencía	Manuel Mencía (1805–1883)	19 February 1837	9 March 1837	18 days	16th Ordinary	Independent	
60	Manuel Barberena	Manuel Barberena (es) (?–1853)	9 February 1838	19 March 1838	38 days	17th Ordinary	Independent	
61	José Rafael Molina y Lara	José Rafael Molina y Lara (1807–1865)	19 March 1838	19 March 1838	1 day	17th Ordinary	Independent	
62	Isidro Menéndez	Isidro Menéndez (es) (1795–1858)	7 February 1839	6 March 1839	27 days	18th Ordinary	Independent	
63	Mariano Morales y Wading	Mariano Morales y Wading (1812–1874)	6 March 1839	7 April 1839	32 days	18th Ordinary	Independent	
64	Norberto Morán	Norberto Morán (1787–1849)	7 April 1839	9 May 1839	32 days	18th Ordinary	Independent	
65	José Dolores Molina y Lara	Colonel; José Dolores Molina y Lara (1812–1882)	14 May 1839	23 May 1839	9 days	18th Ordinary	Independent	
66	Luis Ayala	Luis Ayala (1801–1883)	4 July 1839	13 July 1839	9 days	18th Ordinary	Independent	
67	José María Silva	José María Silva (1804–1876)	1 August 1839	10 August 1839	9 days	2nd Constituent	Independent	
68	Manuel Aguilar	Manuel Aguilar (?–1860)	10 August 1839	19 August 1839	9 days	2nd Constituent	Independent	
69	Pedro de Lara	Presbyter; Pedro de Lara (1878–1854)	19 August 1839	7 February 1840	9 days	2nd Constituent	Independent	
70	Francisco del Castillo	Francisco del Castillo (?–1857)	15 February 1840	25 February 1840	10 days	19th Ordinary	Independent	
71	Manuel Barberena	Manuel Barberena (es) (?–1853)	24 April 1840	27 July 1840	94 days	3rd Constituent	Independent	
72	José Miguel Montoya	José Miguel Montoya (?–1875)	4 January 1841	22 January 1841	18 days	3rd Constituent	Independent	
73	Juan José Guzmán	Colonel; Juan José Guzmán (1797–1847)	22 January 1841	19 February 1841	15 days	3rd Constituent	Conservative	
74	Enrique Hoyos	Enrique Hoyos (1810–1859)	21 October 1841	6 November 1841	16 days	20th Ordinary	Independent	
75	José María Cornejo	José María Cornejo (1788–1864)	29 January 1842	1 October 1842	245 days	21st Ordinary	Conservative	
76	Manuel Mencía	Manuel Mencía (1805–1883)	16 February 1843	25 December 1843	312 days	22nd Ordinary	Independent	
77	Victoriano Rodríguez y Nuila	Victoriano Rodríguez y Nuila (1790–1857)	30 January 1844	11 June 1844	133 days	23rd Ordinary	Independent	
78	Ignacio Blanco	Ignacio Blanco (?–1879)	14 February 1845	13 June 1845	119 days	24th Ordinary	Independent	
79	Anselmo Paiz	Anselmo Paiz (es) (?–1875)	5 February 1846	14 March 1846	37 days	25th Ordinary	Independent	
80	Manuel Mencía	Manuel Mencía (1805–1883)	22 February 1847	19 March 1847	25 days	26th Ordinary	Independent	
81	José María Zelaya Pérez	José María Zelaya Pérez (1817–1868)	25 January 1848	16 March 1848	51 days	27th Ordinary	Independent	
82	Eugenio Aguilar	Eugenio Aguilar (1804–1879)	3 February 1849	22 March 1849	47 days	28th Ordinary	Liberal	
83	Agustín Morales	Agustín Morales (?–1857)	24 January 1850	8 March 1850	43 days	29th Ordinary	Independent	
84	José María San Martín	Colonel; José María San Martín (1811–1857)	18 February 1851	19 March 1851	29 days	30th Ordinary	Conservative	
84	José María San Martín	Colonel; José María San Martín (1811–1857)	26 January 1852	28 February 1852	33 days	31st Ordinary	Conservative	
84	José María San Martín	Colonel; José María San Martín (1811–1857)	2 March 1853	3 April 1853	32 days	32nd Ordinary	Conservative	
85	Juan José Bonilla	Juan José Bonilla (1812–1894)	11 February 1854	14 March 1854	31 days	33rd Ordinary	Independent	
86	Francisco Dueñas	Francisco Dueñas (1810–1884)	27 January 1855	24 February 1855	28 days	34th Ordinary	Conservative	
87	José Mariano Hernández	General; José Mariano Hernández (1786–1864)	21 January 1856	14 April 1856	84 days	35th Ordinary	Conservative	
88	Ignacio Gómez	Ignacio Gómez (1810–1884)	14 January 1857	27 April 1857	103 days	36th Ordinary	Independent	
89	Ignacio Gómez	General; José Trinidad Cabañas (1805–1871)	19 January 1858	20 February 1858	32 days	37th Ordinary	Liberal	
90	Manuel Gallardo	Manuel Gallardo (1826–1913)	17 January 1859	12 February 1859	26 days	38th Ordinary	Independent	
91	José Ángel Quirós	José Ángel Quirós (1820–1867)	18 January 1860	12 February 1860	25 days	39th Ordinary	Independent	
92	Santiago González	Marshal; Santiago González (1818–1887)	27 January 1862	26 February 1862	30 days	40th Ordinary	Liberal	
93	Ireneo Chacón	Ireneo Chacón (1825–1883)	15 February 1864	21 March 1864	35 days	4th Constituent	Independent	
94	Manuel Gallardo	Manuel Gallardo (1826–1913)	16 January 1865	21 February 1865	36 days	41st Ordinary	Independent	
95	Francisco Zaldívar	Francisco Zaldívar (1823–1878)	17 January 1866	28 February 1866	42 days	42nd Ordinary	Independent	
96	Manuel Gallardo	Manuel Gallardo (1826–1913)	16 January 1867	21 February 1867	36 days	43rd Ordinary	Independent	
97	Ireneo Chacón	Ireneo Chacón (1825–1883)	17 January 1868	28 February 1868	32 days	44th Ordinary	Independent	
97	Ireneo Chacón	Ireneo Chacón (1825–1883)	9 January 1869	20 February 1869	42 days	45th Ordinary	Independent	
98	Rafael Zaldívar	Rafael Zaldívar (1837–1903)	15 January 1870	28 February 1870	44 days	46th Ordinary	Liberal	
99	Rafael Campo	Rafael Campo (1813–1890)	1871			5th Constituent	Conservative	
100	Doroteo Vasconcelos	Doroteo Vasconcelos (1803–1883)	15 January 1872	1 April 1872	77 days	47th Ordinary	Liberal	
101	José Dolores Larreynaga Ayala	José Dolores Larreynaga Ayala (1828–1894)	25 September 1872	18 October 1873	1 year, 23 days	6th Constituent	Liberal	
102	Dositeo Fallos	Dositeo Fallos (1831–1901)	22 January 1874	14 March 1874	51 days	48th Ordinary	Independent	
103	Andrés del Valle	Andrés del Valle (1833–1888)	18 January 1875	9 March 1875	50 days	49th Ordinary	Liberal	
104	Mariano Castro	Mariano Castro (1837–1882)	4 January 1876	18 January 1876	14 days	50th Ordinary	Independent	
105	Gregorio López Lemus	Gregorio López Lemus (?–1901)	4 July 1876	23 August 1876	50 days	51st Ordinary	Independent	
106	Domingo López	Domingo López (1833–?)	11 January 1877	3 March 1877	51 days	52nd Ordinary	Independent	
107	José María Vides	José María Vides (es) (1830–1907)	12 January 1878	4 March 1878	51 days	53rd Ordinary	Liberal	
108	Teodoro Moreno	Teodoro Moreno (es) (1821–1885)	15 January 1879	27 February 1879	43 days	54th Ordinary	Conservative	
108	Teodoro Moreno	Teodoro Moreno (es) (1821–1885)	9 June 1879	1 March 1880	266 days	7th Constituent	Conservative	
108	Teodoro Moreno	Teodoro Moreno (es) (1821–1885)	15 January 1881	22 March 1881	66 days	55th Ordinary	Conservative	
108	Teodoro Moreno	Teodoro Moreno (es) (1821–1885)	14 January 1882	9 March 1882	54 days	56th Ordinary	Conservative	
108	Teodoro Moreno	Teodoro Moreno (es) (1821–1885)	4 January 1883	22 February 1883	49 days	57th Ordinary	Conservative	
108	Teodoro Moreno	Teodoro Moreno (es) (1821–1885)	19 November 1883	14 December 1883	25 days	8th Constituent	Conservative	
109	Ángel Guirola	Ángel Guirola (1826–1910)	14 January 1885	29 May 1885	135 days	58th Ordinary	Liberal	
109	Ángel Guirola	Ángel Guirola (1826–1910)	14 January 1885	29 May 1885	135 days	59th Ordinary	Liberal	
110	Hermógenes Alvarado Gómez	Hermógenes Alvarado Gómez (1845–1900)	14 September 1885	26 November 1885	73 days	9th Constituent	Liberal	
111	Francisco Esteban Galindo	Francisco Esteban Galindo (1850–1896)	21 June 1886	30 June 1886	9 days	10th Constituent	Liberal	
112	Antonio Ruiz Aguilar	Antonio Ruiz Aguilar (1832–1900)	30 June 1886	30 September 1886	92 days	10th Constituent	Liberal	
President of the Legislative Assembly
1	José Valle Rodríguez	José Valle Rodríguez (1828–1906)	15 February 1887	26 April 1887	70 days	60th Ordinary	Liberal	
2	José Dolores Larreynaga Ayala	José Dolores Larreynaga Ayala (1828–1894)	13 February 1888	7 April 1888	54 days	61st Ordinary	Liberal	
3	José Rocas Pacas Pineda	José Rocas Pacas Pineda (1850–1909)	16 February 1889	13 April 1889	56 days	62nd Ordinary	Liberal	
4	Francisco Vaquero	Francisco Vaquero (1848–1928)	15 February 1890	18 September 1890	214 days	63rd Ordinary	Liberal	
5	José Domingo Arce y Rascón	José Domingo Arce y Rascón (1846–1901)	10 February 1891	2 May 1891	81 days	64th Ordinary	Liberal	
6	Onofre Durán	Onofre Durán (1836–1914)	15 February 1892	1 October 1892	229 days	65th Ordinary	Liberal	
7	Antonio Castro Rodríguez	Antonio Castro Rodríguez (1845–1902)	20 February 1893	15 July 1893	145 days	66th Ordinary	Liberal	
8	Rafael Pinto Figueroa	Rafael Pinto Figueroa (1832–1917)	15 February 1894	20 April 1894	64 days	67th Ordinary	Liberal	
9	Joaquín Medina Rodríguez	Joaquín Medina Rodríguez (1831–1908)	15 February 1895	23 April 1895	67 days	68th Ordinary	Liberal	
10	Eduardo Arriola Zelaya	Eduardo Arriola Zelaya (1846–1900)	15 February 1896	13 May 1896	88 days	69th Ordinary	Liberal	
11	Dositeo Fallos	Dositeo Fallos (1831–1901)	15 February 1897	5 January 1898	324 days	70th Ordinary	Liberal	
12	Julio Interiano	Julio Interiano (1852–1924)	15 February 1898	12 April 1898	56 days	71st Ordinary	Liberal	
13	Trinidad Romero	Trinidad Romero (1848–1904)	12 April 1898	20 April 1898	8 days	71st Ordinary	Liberal	
14	Dionisio Aráuz	Dionisio Aráuz (1845–?)	1899			72nd Ordinary	Liberal	
15	Eduardo Arriola Zelaya	Eduardo Arriola Zelaya (1846–1900)	30 January 1900	1900		73rd Ordinary	Liberal	
16	Ramón García González	Ramón García González (1853–1934)	30 January 1901	1901		74th Ordinary	Liberal	
17	Dionisio Aráuz	Dionisio Aráuz (1845–?)	30 January 1902	1902		75th Ordinary	Liberal	
18	Fidel Novoa Meléndez	Fidel Novoa Meléndez (1863–1922)	31 January 1903	1903		76th Ordinary	Liberal	
19	Federico Mejía	Federico Mejía (?–1937)	26 January 1904	1904		77th Ordinary	Liberal	
19	Federico Mejía	Federico Mejía (?–1937)	25 January 1907	1907		78th Ordinary	Liberal	
20	Dionisio Aráuz	Dionisio Aráuz (1845–?)	29 January 1906	1906		79th Ordinary	Liberal	
21	Ramón García González	Ramón García González (1853–1934)	31 January 1907	1907		80th Ordinary	Liberal	
22	Antonio Martínez	Antonio Martínez (?–?)	29 January 1908	1908		81st Ordinary	Liberal	
23	Rafael Pinto Figueroa	Rafael Pinto Figueroa (1832–1917)	28 January 1909	1909		82nd Ordinary	Liberal	
23	Rafael Pinto Figueroa	Rafael Pinto Figueroa (1832–1917)	25 April 1910	1911		83rd Ordinary	Liberal	
23	Rafael Pinto Figueroa	Rafael Pinto Figueroa (1832–1917)	5 February 1912	1912		84th Ordinary	Liberal	
24	Carlos Meléndez	Carlos Meléndez (1861–1919)	1 February 1913	1913		85th Ordinary	Liberal	
25	Francisco García de Machón	Francisco García de Machón (1857–1917)	28 January 1914	1914		86th Ordinary	Liberal	
25	Francisco García de Machón	Francisco García de Machón (1857–1917)	26 January 1915	1915		87th Ordinary	Liberal	
26	José Miguel Batrés	General; José Miguel Batrés (1855–1941)	24 January 1916	1916		88th Ordinary	Liberal	
26	José Miguel Batrés	General; José Miguel Batrés (1855–1941)	29 January 1917	1917		89th Ordinary	Liberal	
26	José Miguel Batrés	General; José Miguel Batrés (1855–1941)	28 January 1918	1918		90th Ordinary	Liberal	
27	Joaquín Falla Cañas	Joaquín Falla Cañas (1854–1923)	28 January 1919	1919		91st Ordinary	National Democratic Party	
28	Roberto Parker	Roberto Parker (?–?)	24 January 1920	1920		92nd Ordinary	National Democratic Party	
29	Modesto Castro	Modesto Castro (?–?)	21 January 1921	1921		93rd Ordinary	National Democratic Party	
30	Daniel González	Daniel González (?–?)	3 February 1922	1922		94th Ordinary	National Democratic Party	
31	José Antonio Rodríguez	José Antonio Rodríguez (?–?)	23 January 1923	1923		95th Ordinary	National Democratic Party	
31	José Antonio Rodríguez	José Antonio Rodríguez (?–?)	25 January 1924	1924		96th Ordinary	National Democratic Party	
31	José Antonio Rodríguez	José Antonio Rodríguez (?–?)	24 January 1925	1925		97th Ordinary	National Democratic Party	
31	José Antonio Rodríguez	José Antonio Rodríguez (?–?)	5 February 1926	1926		98th Ordinary	National Democratic Party	
31	José Antonio Rodríguez	José Antonio Rodríguez (?–?)	19 February 1927	1927		99th Ordinary	National Democratic Party	
32	Fernando López	Fernando López (?–?)	25 January 1928	1928		100th Ordinary	Independent	
32	Fernando López	Fernando López (?–?)	1929			101st Ordinary	Independent	
33	Francisco Antonio Reyes	Francisco Antonio Reyes (1860–1951)	25 January 1930	1930		102nd Ordinary	Liberal	
34	José Maximiliano Olano	José Maximiliano Olano (?–?)	1931			103rd Ordinary	Salvadoran Laborist Party	
35	Honorato Villacorta	Honorato Villacorta (?–?)	21 January 1932	1932		104th Ordinary	Independent	
36	Rodolfo Víctor Morales	Colonel; Rodolfo Víctor Morales (?–?)	20 January 1933	1933		105th Ordinary	Independent	
36	Rodolfo Víctor Morales	Colonel; Rodolfo Víctor Morales (?–?)	6 February 1934	1934		106th Ordinary	National Pro Patria Party	
37	Unknown officeholder	Unknown officeholder	1935			107th Ordinary	National Pro Patria Party	
38	César Cierra	César Cierra (?–?)	27 February 1936	1936		108th Ordinary	National Pro Patria Party	
38	César Cierra	César Cierra (?–?)	25 January 1937	1937		109th Ordinary	National Pro Patria Party	
38	César Cierra	César Cierra (?–?)	27 January 1938	1938		11th Constituent	National Pro Patria Party	
39	Francisco Antonio Reyes	Francisco Antonio Reyes (1860–1951)	18 February 1939	1939		110th Ordinary	National Pro Patria Party	
39	Francisco Antonio Reyes	Francisco Antonio Reyes (1860–1951)	16 January 1940	1940		111th Ordinary	National Pro Patria Party	
39	Francisco Antonio Reyes	Francisco Antonio Reyes (1860–1951)	25 January 1941	1941		112th Ordinary	National Pro Patria Party	
39	Francisco Antonio Reyes	Francisco Antonio Reyes (1860–1951)	28 January 1942	1942		113th Ordinary	National Pro Patria Party	
39	Francisco Antonio Reyes	Francisco Antonio Reyes (1860–1951)	23 January 1943	1943		114th Ordinary	National Pro Patria Party	
39	Francisco Antonio Reyes	Francisco Antonio Reyes (1860–1951)	17 January 1944	3 April 1944	77 days	12th Constituent	National Pro Patria Party	
40	Ricardo Rivas Vides	Ricardo Rivas Vides (?–?)	1 February 1945	1945		13th Constituent	Independent	
40	Ricardo Rivas Vides	Ricardo Rivas Vides (?–?)	5 February 1946	1946		115th Ordinary	Independent	
40	Ricardo Rivas Vides	Ricardo Rivas Vides (?–?)	4 February 1947	1947		116th Ordinary	Independent	
40	Ricardo Rivas Vides	Ricardo Rivas Vides (?–?)	7 March 1948	16 December 1948	284 days	117th Ordinary	Independent	
41	Reynaldo Galindo Pohl	Reynaldo Galindo Pohl (1918–2012)	11 May 1950	1 May 1952	1 year, 356 days	14th Constituent; 118th Ordinary	Revolutionary Party of Democratic Unification	
42	José María Peralta Salazar	José María Peralta Salazar (1918–2012)	1 May 1952	1 May 1954	2 years, 0 days	119th Ordinary	Revolutionary Party of Democratic Unification	
42	José María Peralta Salazar	José María Peralta Salazar (1918–2012)	1 May 1954	1 May 1956	2 years, 0 days	120th Ordinary	Revolutionary Party of Democratic Unification	
43	René Carmona Dárdano	René Carmona Dárdano (?–?)	1 May 1956	1 May 1958	2 years, 0 days	121st Ordinary	Revolutionary Party of Democratic Unification	
44	Víctor Manuel Esquivel Rodríguez	Víctor Manuel Esquivel Rodríguez (?–?)	1 May 1958	1 May 1960	2 years, 0 days	122nd Ordinary	Revolutionary Party of Democratic Unification	
44	Víctor Manuel Esquivel Rodríguez	Víctor Manuel Esquivel Rodríguez (?–?)	1 May 1960	1960		123rd Ordinary	Revolutionary Party of Democratic Unification	
45	Eusebio Rodolfo Cordón Cea	Eusebio Rodolfo Cordón Cea (1899–1966)	3 January 1962	1 May 1964	2 years, 119 days	15th Constituent	Independent	
46	Francisco José Guerrero	Francisco José Guerrero (1925–1989)	1 May 1964	1 May 1966	2 years, 0 days	124th Ordinary	National Conciliation Party	
46	Francisco José Guerrero	Francisco José Guerrero (1925–1989)	1 May 1966	1 May 1966	2 years, 0 days	125th Ordinary	National Conciliation Party	
47	Juan Gregorio Guardado	Juan Gregorio Guardado (1899–1966)	1 May 1968	1 May 1970	2 years, 0 days	126th Ordinary	National Conciliation Party	
48	Salvador Guerra Hércules	Salvador Guerra Hércules (?–?)	1 May 1970	1 May 1972	2 years, 0 days	127th Ordinary	National Conciliation Party	
49	Rubén Alfonso Rodríguez	Rubén Alfonso Rodríguez (?–?)	1 May 1972	1 May 1974	2 years, 0 days	128th Ordinary	National Conciliation Party	
49	Rubén Alfonso Rodríguez	Rubén Alfonso Rodríguez (?–?)	1 May 1974	1 May 1976	2 years, 0 days	129th Ordinary	National Conciliation Party	
49	Rubén Alfonso Rodríguez	Rubén Alfonso Rodríguez (?–?)	1 May 1976	1 May 1978	2 years, 0 days	130th Ordinary	National Conciliation Party	
50	José Leandro Echeverría	José Leandro Echeverría (?–?)	1 May 1978	15 October 1979	1 year, 167 days	131st Ordinary	National Conciliation Party	
51	Roberto D'Aubuisson	Roberto D'Aubuisson (1943–1992)	26 April 1982	20 December 1983	1 year, 238 days	16th Constituent	Nationalist Republican Alliance	
52	María Julia Castillo Rodas	María Julia Castillo Rodas (1935–2016)	20 December 1983	1 May 1985	1 year, 132 days	16th Constituent	National Conciliation Party	
53	Guillermo Antonio Guevara	Guillermo Antonio Guevara (?–?)	1 May 1985	1 May 1988	3 years, 0 days	131st Ordinary	National Conciliation Party	
54	Ricardo Alvarenga Valdivieso	Ricardo Alvarenga Valdivieso (?–?)	1 May 1988	1 May 1991	3 years, 0 days	132nd Ordinary	Nationalist Republican Alliance	
55	Luis Roberto Angulo Samayoa	Luis Roberto Angulo Samayoa (?–?)	1 May 1991	1 May 1994	3 years, 0 days	133rd Ordinary	Nationalist Republican Alliance	
56	Gloria Salguero Gross	Gloria Salguero Gross (1941–2015)	1 May 1994	1 May 1997	3 years, 0 days	134th Ordinary	Nationalist Republican Alliance	
57	Francisco Flores Pérez	Francisco Flores Pérez (1959–2016)	1 May 1997	1 May 1998	1 year, 0 days	135th Ordinary	Nationalist Republican Alliance	
58	Juan Duch Martínez	Juan Duch Martínez (1959–2016)	1 May 1998	1 May 2000	2 years, 0 days	135th Ordinary	Nationalist Republican Alliance	
59	Ciro Cruz Zepeda	Ciro Cruz Zepeda (1945–2022)	1 May 2000	1 May 2001	1 year, 0 days	136th Ordinary	National Conciliation Party	
60	Walter Araujo	Walter Araujo (born 1964)	1 May 2001	1 May 2002	1 year, 0 days	136th Ordinary	Nationalist Republican Alliance	
61	Ciro Cruz Zepeda	Ciro Cruz Zepeda (1945–2022)	1 May 2002	1 May 2003	1 year, 0 days	136th Ordinary	National Conciliation Party	
61	Ciro Cruz Zepeda	Ciro Cruz Zepeda (1945–2022)	1 May 2003	1 May 2006	3 years, 0 days	137th Ordinary	National Conciliation Party	
62	Rubén Orellana	Rubén Orellana (?–2012)	1 May 2006	1 May 2009	3 years, 0 days	138th Ordinary	National Conciliation Party	
63	Ciro Cruz Zepeda	Ciro Cruz Zepeda (1945–2022)	1 May 2009	1 February 2011	1 year, 276 days	139th Ordinary	National Conciliation Party	
64	Sigfrido Reyes Morales	Sigfrido Reyes Morales (born 1960)	1 February 2011	1 May 2012	1 year, 90 days	139th Ordinary	Farabundo Martí National Liberation Front	
64	Sigfrido Reyes Morales	Sigfrido Reyes Morales (born 1960)	1 May 2012	1 May 2015	3 years, 0 days	140th Ordinary	Farabundo Martí National Liberation Front	
65	Lorena Peña	Lorena Peña (born 1955)	14 May 2015	8 November 2016	1 year, 178 days	141st Ordinary	Farabundo Martí National Liberation Front	
66	Guillermo Gallegos	Guillermo Gallegos (born 1970)	8 November 2016	1 May 2018	1 year, 174 days	141st Ordinary	Grand Alliance for National Unity	
67	Norman Quijano	Norman Quijano (born 1946)	1 May 2018	1 November 2019	1 year, 184 days	142nd Ordinary	Nationalist Republican Alliance	
68	Mario Ponce	Mario Ponce (born 1963)	1 November 2019	1 May 2021	1 year, 181 days	142nd Ordinary	National Coalition Party	
69	Ernesto Castro	Ernesto Castro (born 1971)	1 May 2021	1 May 2024	3 years, 0 days	143rd Ordinary	Nuevas Ideas	
69	Ernesto Castro	Ernesto Castro (born 1971)	1 May 2024	Incumbent	2 years, 29 days	144th Ordinary	Nuevas Ideas	
