= Agua Blanca, Jutiapa =

Agua Blanca
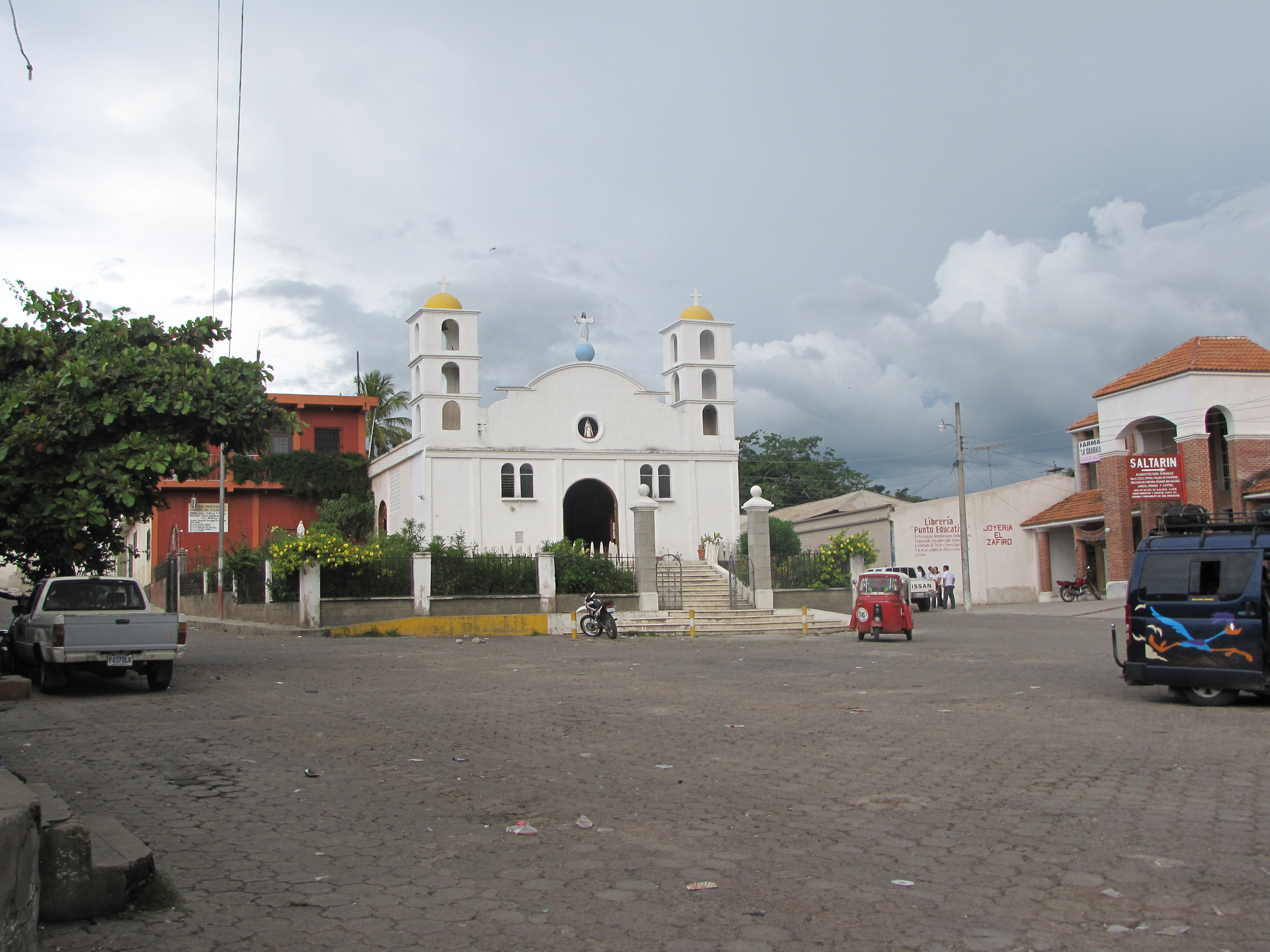

- Location in Guatemala
- Coordinates: 14°29′0″N 89°38′58″W
- Country: Guatemala
- Department: Jutiapa

Population (2022)
  - Total: 17,765
- Climate: Aw

Agua Blanca (Spanish pronunciation: [ˈaɣwa ˈβlaŋka]) is a municipality in the Jutiapa department of Guatemala.

Like most eastern regions of Guatemala near Jutiapa ('el oriente') most locals in Agua Blanca embrace- as Americans refer to it- a typical cowboy, 'old western' culture. To see mustached men in tight blue jeans wearing cowboy hats and boots, carrying fully armed hand guns, with long magazines tightly secured to their leather belts in public venues with children present, is to capture in a microcosm the cultural norm of Agua Blanca, as this 'outlaw' culture- most similar to that of Mexican drug cartels- is quickly being accepted and assimilated into the regional culture.

The most important event in Agua Blanca is its annual festival in January. As in most regions and towns in Catholic Guatemala and Latin America, the municipality of Agua Blanca holds an annual cultural, community festival known as, "Feria de Los Reyes Magos." For several days, celebrations that include carnival rides, games, delicious food, Jaripeos (bull-riding contests) and a fireworks display at the central municipal park, are held to celebrate the new year and, especially, the Epiphany.

== Statistics ==
=== General ===
- Population: 18.663
- Population in urban area: 4.293
- Population in rural area: 14.370
- Density: 55 hab/km^{2} territorial
- Extension: 340 km^{2}
- Number of populated sites: 86

=== Ecosystems ===
- community center: 1.90%
- cattle Natural: 1%
- Bushes and Scrubs: 45.40%
- Forest of Broadleaved: 0.11%
- Forest of coniferous: 1.20% annual
- Agricultural: 42.30%
- Rice: 4.80%
- Lakes and lagoons: 0.20%
- Bushwood: 0.30% forest
- Plantation you confer: 0.10%
- Bushes: 2.50%

=== Demographics ===
- Total of houses: 5.059
- Population of 6 to 19 years: 32.7%
- Population of 20 or more: 47.1% urban
- Population: 32.8% rural
- Population: 67.2%

=== Municipal infrastructure ===
- Communities with electrical service: 98.7%
- Houses with electrical service: 99.5%
- Communities with water: 70.6%
- Houses with service of water: 65.0%
- Communities with drainage: 4.2%
- Houses with latrine or another one: 37.2%
- Houses formal: 96.6%
- Houses non formal: 3.4%
- Rented house: 17.0%

=== Education ===
- Population: 5.125 secundaria
