= José Francisco Barrundia =

Mexican politician

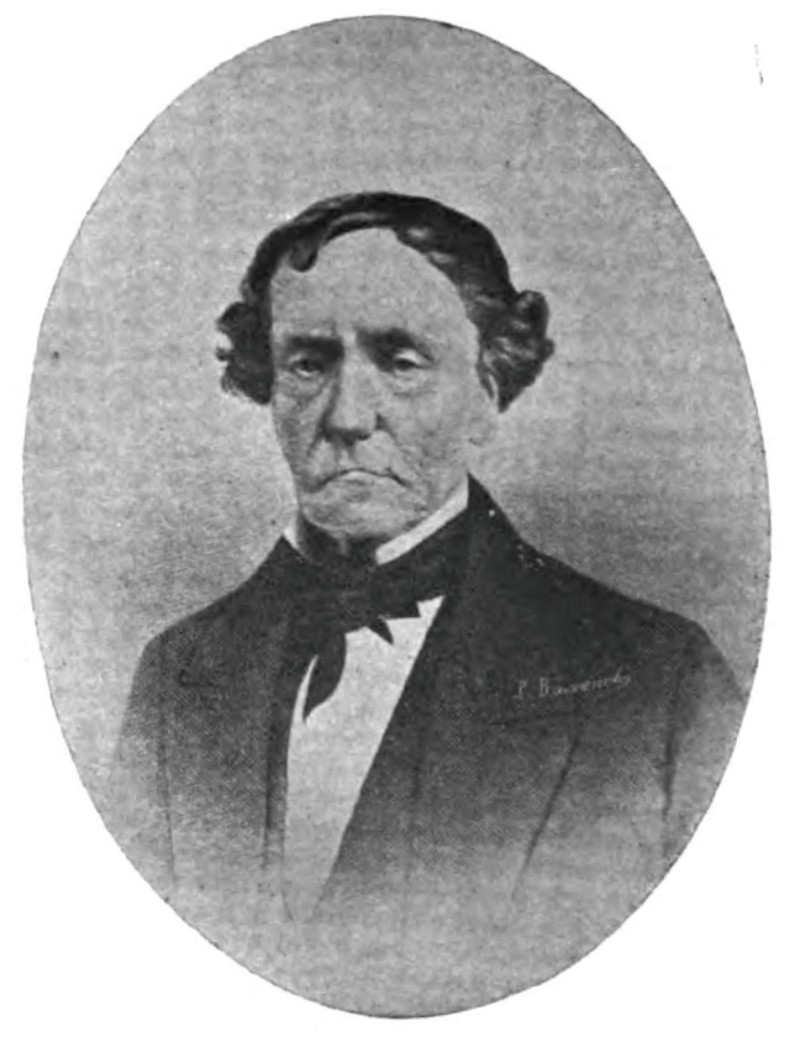
José Francisco Barrundia

José Francisco Barrundia y Cepeda (May 12, 1787, Guatemala City – August 4, 1854, New York City) was a liberal Central American politician. From June 26, 1829 to September 16, 1830 he was interim president of the Federal Republic of Central America.

== Background ==
Barrundia was born in Guatemala, New Spain. He studied at the Colegio Tridentino, where he became a bachelor of philosophy on March 19, 1803. His brother Juan Barrundia was head of the province of Guatemala in 1829.

José Barrundia was considered an outstanding intellectual and man of letters, fluent in several languages. He translated into Spanish the Livingston Code (penal code of Louisiana) in order to adapt it to the country. He was a populist member of the Central American Congress and in his later career he served as minister plenipotentiary of Honduras in New York City.

== Political career and presidency ==
In 1825 he was elected the first vice president of the United Provinces of Central America, under Manuel José Arce, but he declined the office. He did serve as senator. From Congress he criticized the increasing conservatism of Arce. In 1826 Arce unconstitutionally dissolved the Congress, and this led to civil war.

He was a strong supporter of Honduran liberal Francisco Morazán. With the fall of Arce and the triumph of Morazán, Barrundia became interim president of the United Provinces (July 1829), with a mandate to organize elections. Elections were held in July 1830, and in September Morazán succeeded him as president.

== After serving as president ==
From 1831 to 1835 he was secretary of education of the state government of Guatemala, under Mariano Gálvez. It was during this time that he translated the Livingston Code. However, he became estranged from Gálvez, and in 1838 contributed to his fall from power. This led to the ascent of Conservative Rafael Carrera. In 1839 he proposed to the Guatemalan Congress the withdrawal of the state from the Central American Federation. This was approved by Congress.

In 1848 he founded the newspaper Album Republicano.

A strong supporter of human rights, in 1850 he opposed Carrera, because of his bloody regime and his ignorance. He also challenged the influence of the Church. Before his death he became minister of Honduras, negotiating in Washington, D.C. for annexation to the United States.

Though not a rich man, Barrundia refused his salary for the public positions he held.

He died in New York in 1854 while serving as Honduran minister plenipotentiary. Guatemalan President Manuel Estrada Cabrera had his remains repatriated in 1913.

Preceded by Francisco Morazán	President of Central America; 1829–1830	Succeeded by Francisco Morazán
