= María Dolores de Aycinena =

María Dolores de Aycinena y Micheo

First Lady of Guatemala
- In role 14 April 1865 – 24 May 1865
- President: Pedro de Aycinena y Piñol
- Preceded by: Petrona García Morales
- Succeeded by: Josefa Gutiérrez Argueta

Personal details
- Born: María Dolores de Aycinena y Micheo; 29 October 1814 Guatemala City, Viceroyalty of New Spain
- Died: 29 May 1874 (aged 59) Guatemala City, Guatemala
- Spouse: Pedro de Aycinena y Piñol
- Children: 2

María Dolores de Aycinena y Micheo (29 October 1814 – 29 May 1874) was a Guatemalan woman. She was the wife of Acting President Pedro de Aycinena y Piñol, First Lady of Guatemala during his government in 1865. She was daughter of José Aycinena Carrillo and Mariana Micheo Delgado Nájera. She died in 1874, subsequently Aycinena died in 1897.

Honorary titles
Preceded by Petrona García Morales	First Lady of Guatemala; 1865	Succeeded by Josefa Gutiérrez Argueta
