= Numismatic Museum of Guatemala =

- Established: July 11, 2006; 19 years ago
- Location: Guatemala City, Guatemala
- Coordinates: 14.625762°N 90.513606°W
- Type: Numismatic museum

The Numismatic Museum of Guatemala (Spanish: Museo Numismático de Guatemala) is a museum in Guatemala City. The museum is dedicated to the history of banknotes and coins used in the country.

== History ==
The idea of creating the museum was approved by the Monetary Board of Guatemala in 1978, in 2004 the museum project was taken up by Oscar Ricardo Martinez. The museum was inaugurated in July 2006.

== Collections ==
The museum contains more than 3 thousand pieces among its collections are banknotes and coins as well as documents and medals. The museum contains objects ranging from the seventeenth to the nineteenth century, including minting machines. In the Pre-Hispanic Room, you can find different objects that were used by the Mayas for exchange, such as obsidian stones, cacao, bird feathers, jade and ceramic pieces. In the Colonial Room are the coins that were used by the Spaniards when they arrived in Mesoamerica. The Independence and Central American Federation Room shows the first coins used by the countries of the Federation. The Republic Room is dedicated to monetary policies from 1847 to 1924. The museum has a vault containing gold coins from the period of the government of President Rafael Carrera.
