= Trajanopolis =

Trajanopolis or Traianopolis (Ancient Greek: Τραϊανούπολις Traianoupolis) may refer to several cities named after Trajan:

- Traianopolis in Cilicia, a former name of Gazipaşa, Turkey
- Traianopolis in Phrygia, a former city in Turkey
- Traianopolis in Thrace, a city in Greece

== See also ==
- Augusta Traiana, a Roman city on the site of present-day Stara Zagora, Bulgaria
