= Concordat of 1854 =

1854 concordat between Guatemala and the Vatican

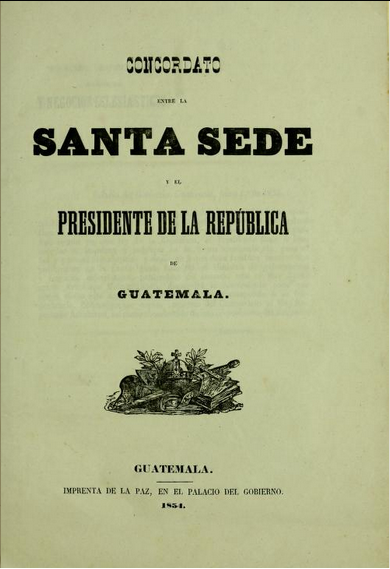
- Front page of the Concordat
- Created: 1852
- Ratified: 1854
- Location: Holy See, Congress of Guatemala
- Author(s): Fernando Lorenzana and Juan José de Aycinena y Piñol
- Signatories: Giacomo Antonelli; Rafael Carrera; Pedro de Aycinena
- Purpose: Giving the Catholic Church authority to mandate tithes and censor published materials

The Concordat between the Holy See and the President of the Republic of Guatemala (Spanish: Concordato entre la Santa Sede y el Presidente de la República de Guatemala), referred to colloquially as the Concordat of 1854 (Spanish: Concordato de 1854), was a concordat between Rafael Carrera, President of Guatemala, and the Holy See, which was signed in 1852 and ratified by both parties in 1854.

As a result of the concordat, Guatemala gave the education of Guatemalan people to regular orders Catholic Church, committed to respect ecclesiastical property and monasteries, imposed mandatory tithing and allowed the bishops to censor what was published in the country; in return, Guatemala received dispensations for the members of the army, allowed those who had acquired the properties that the Liberals had expropriated the Church in 1829 to keep those properties, perceived taxes generated by the properties of the Church, and had the right to judge certain crimes committed by clergy under Guatemalan law. The concordat was designed by Juan José de Aycinena y Piñol and reestablished the relationship between Church and State in Guatemala. It was in force until the fall of the conservative government of Marshal Vicente Cerna y Cerna.

== Contents ==
The concordat was originally signed in Rome on 7 October 1852 by Cardinal Giacomo Antonelli, Cardinal Secretary of State, and Fernando Lorenzana, minister plenipotentiary of Guatemala before the Holy See. It consists of twenty nine items, written in Latin and Spanish, which are summarized as follows:

- Article 1: The Catholic religion was declared the official religion of the Republic of Guatemala
- Article 2: education of the Guatemalan people was in charge of the Catholic Church
- Article 3: the bishops could censor those publications that might contravene the provisions of the Catholic religion.
- Article 4: the Pope could communicate with the Guatemalan people directly, as head of the Catholic Church.
- Article 5: imposed mandatory tithing, which was used for the archbishopric, the cathedral chapter and the Seminary.
- Article 6: Parsons emoluments were decreed by the civil and ecclesiastical authorities.
- Article 7: the President of Guatemala had the privilege of presenting a slate of candidates for vacant parishes.
- Article 8: the President could also present ecclesiastical candidates for the offices of the archbishop, but the archbishop himself was going to be chosen by the Pope, among respected clerics from Guatemala.
- Articles 10-12: the Holy See reserved the right to establish new dioceses and parishes in the Republic whenever it saw fit The Seminary was under the jurisdiction of the Archdiocese of Guatemala; and any new diocese would have its own Seminary
- Articles 14-17: ecclesiastical courts and possible exceptions thereto were established.
- Articles 18 and 19: the church could purchase properties and promised to pay income taxes except on tithing and alms
- Article 20: the Holy See renounced the property that had been expropriated by Francisco Morazán in 1829, and had been acquired by individuals before 1852
- Article 21:. monasteries were protected by the State
- Article 22: Guatemala's government pledged to help evangelization in the country, which would be led by the Congregation of Propaganda Fide.
- Article 23: as the government pledged to respect the Catholic Church, the Holy See issued the following oath for their bishops and other clergy in the country: I swear and promise to God and the Holy Gospels obedience to the governments established by the Constitution of the Republic of Guatemala; and also promise not interfere personally or through advice on any project that may be contrary to national independence or the public peace.

== Bibliography ==
- Aycinena, Pedro de (1854). Concordato entre la Santa Sede y el presidente de la República de Guatemala (in Latin and Spanish). Guatemala: Imprenta La Paz.
