= Petrona García Morales =

Wife of former Guatemalan President, Rafael Carrera

First Lady of Guatemala
- In role November 6, 1851 – August 17, 1857
- President: Rafael Carrera
- Preceded by: Herself
- Succeeded by: María Dolores Micheo (1865)
- In role March 21, 1847 – August 17, 1848
- President: Rafael Carrera
- Preceded by: Position established
- Succeeded by: Herself

Spouse of the Head of State of Guatemala
- In role December 4, 1844 – March 21, 1847
- President: Rafael Carrera
- Preceded by: Dorotea Rosales y Ojeda
- Succeeded by: Position abolished

Personal details
- Born: Petrona García y Morales; April 29, 1817 Guatemala City, Viceroyalty of New Spain
- Died: August 17, 1857 (aged 40) Guatemala City, Guatemala
- Spouse: Rafael Carrera (m. 1835; died 1857)

Petrona García y Morales (April 29, 1817 – August 17, 1857) was a Guatemalan woman. She was the wife of Guatemalan President Rafael Carrera, the first president of Guatemala.

== Biography ==
She was born in Mataquescuintla of humble origins. Subsequently, she married Rafael Carrera in 1833. During the battles of Rafael Carrera stand out: the barracks of Mataquescuintla; the one of Ambelis in Santa Rosa, defeating the army commanded by Teodoro Mejía; that of December 7, 1837 in the Jalapa plaza where he was defeated; and on January 13, 1838, where the Guatemalan Garrison was attacked. Some of these military events were accompanied by regrettable acts committed by both sides, such as robberies, assaults, raids and murders of defenseless people. In particular, the government of Gálvez, upon learning that Carrera was the leader of the revolt, invaded Mataquescuintla and captured his wife, Petrona García, whom the soldiers took by force; when he heard Carrera, he swore to avenge the outrage against his wife, and accompanied by her, he restarted the fight with new vigor. Petrona Garcia, inflamed by the desire for revenge, committed numerous atrocities against the Liberal troops, to the point that many of the members of Carrera feared her more than the leader himself, even though Carrera by then showed the features of leadership and military expertise that would characterize it.

Petrona García Morales subsequently stayed with Rafael Carrera during his administration. In 1857, an epidemic of cholera broke out that caused many deaths in the country, including that of Petrona García. Three days of national mourning were decreed.

== Bibliography ==
- González Davison, Fernando (2008). La montaña infinita; Carrera, caudillo de Guatemala (in Spanish). Guatemala: Artemis y Edinter. ISBN 978-84-89452-81-7.
- Miceli, Keith (1974). "Rafael Carrera: Defender and Promoter of Peasant Interests in Guatemala, 1837–1848". The Americas. 31 (1). Academy of American Franciscan History: 72–95. doi:10.1017/S000316150008843X. JSTOR 980382. S2CID 197669388.

Honorary titles
Preceded by Herself	First Lady of Guatemala; 1851–1857	Succeeded by María Dolores Micheo (1865)
Preceded by Position established	First Lady of Guatemala; 1847–1848	Succeeded by Herself
Preceded by Dorotea Rosales y Ojeda	First Lady of Guatemala; 1844–1847	Succeeded by Position abolished
