= Francisco de Paula García Peláez =

- Archbishop of Guatemala
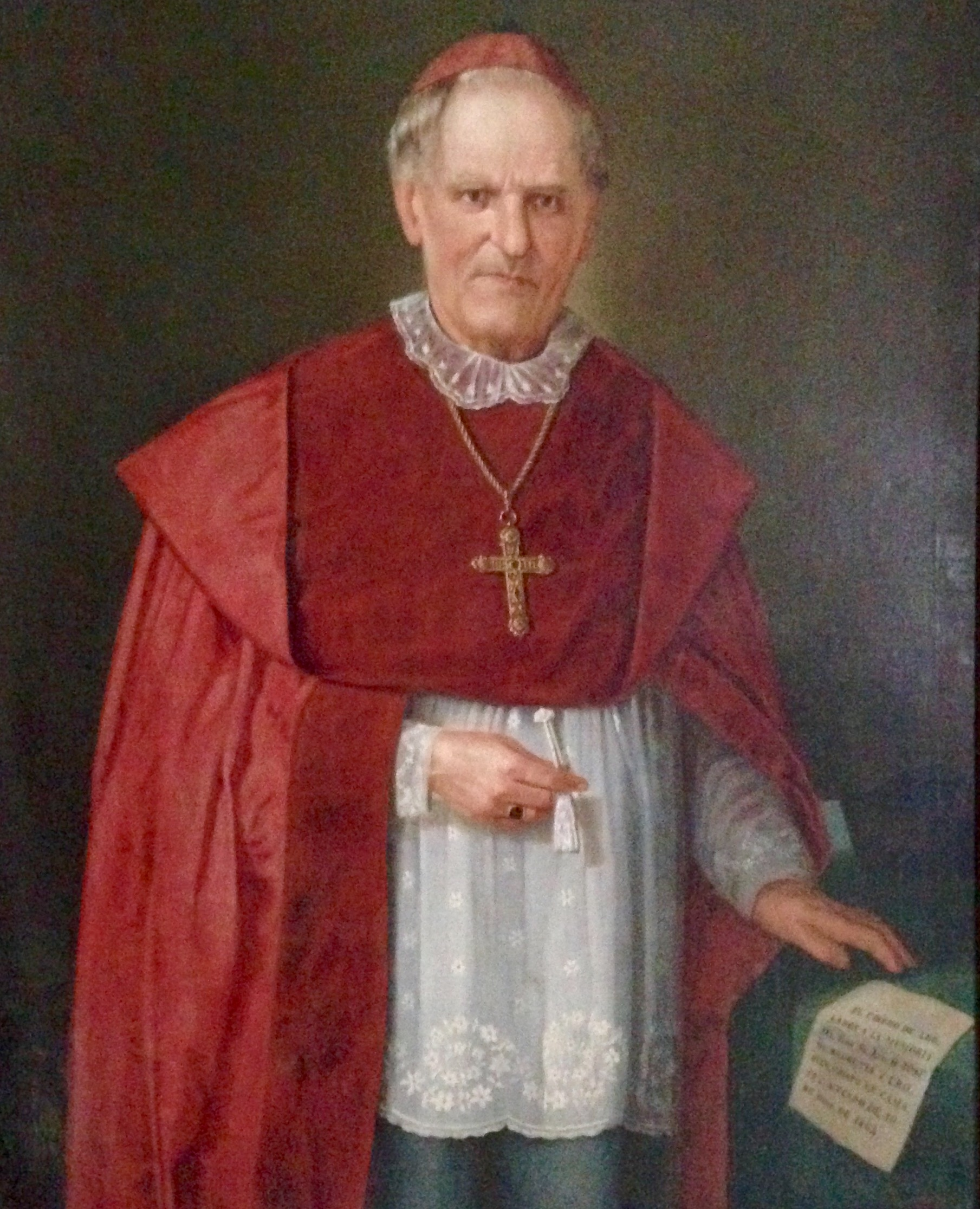
- García Peláez in 1850
- Appointed: November 10, 1845
- Predecessor: Ramón Casaús
- Successor: Juan José Aycinena

Personal details
- Born: Francisco de Paula García y Peláez; April 2, 1785 San Juan Sacatepéquez, Guatemala
- Died: January 25, 1867 (aged 81)
- Occupation: Historian; economist
- Education: Universidad de San Carlos de Guatemala

Francisco de Paula García y Peláez (April 2, 1785 – January 25, 1867) was a Guatemalan historian and economist who served as Archbishop of Guatemala from 1845 until his death.

As a historian, García Peláez was commissioned to write histories of colonial Central America. His 1852 three-volume publication, Memoirs for the History of the Ancient Kingdom of Guatemala (Spanish: Memorias para la Historia del Antiguo Reino de Guatemala), focused on Guatemala's colonial era. The work aimed to emphasize the destructive effects of colonial exploitation on indigenous populations and challenge the legacy of colonial policies.

== Early life and education ==
García Peláez was born in San Juan Sacatepéquez to a modest Ladino family. Despite their limited resources, his family ensured he received a strong education. He was introduced to the study of Latin language by his paternal uncle, Don Domingo Garcia de Salas, and entered the priesthood during the early years of the independence movement and aligned himself with liberal ideals. García Peláez studied civil and canon law at the Universidad de San Carlos de Guatemala, earning a doctorate of theology in 1819. For the late colonial period, he was moderately liberal, and he advanced in the clergy through his intelligence and strong sense of duty.

== Archbishop of Guatemala ==
After archbishop Ramón Casaús was exiled to Havana, García Peláez was chosen as his successor and officially took over the position following Casaús' death in 1845. This appointment was considered a setback for the aristocracy, who expected Juan José Aycinena would be selected for the role. García Peláez's tenure spanned the entire duration of Rafael Carrera's presidency.

== Historian and writer ==
Guatemalan president, Mariano Gálvez, commissioned García Peláez to write histories of colonial Central America. A 16th-century legal case was preserved as a revered artifact by the leaders of Ciudad Vieja, and when shown to García Peláez in the mid-nineteenth century, he praised its exceptional condition.

=== Memorias para la Historia del Antiguo Reino de Guatemala ===
In 1852, García Peláez published Memorias para la Historia del Antiguo Reino de Guatemala, a three-volume work in the form of weekly installments. Primarily focusing on the colonial period, he believed that Guatemala's indigenous ruins were superior than to Mexico's, following their separation in 1823, and rejected the idea that the Maya ruins were built by the ancestors of the indigenous people of his country, instead crediting their creation to an unknown civilization. A central focus of the work was the importance of indigenous labor to Guatemala's economy by emphasizing the vital contribution of the indigenous population to agricultural production and the supply of goods. García Peláez noted that widespread poverty and a sense of despair led to idleness and misconduct to explain why indigenous people were often reluctant to work on haciendas unless forced. He argued that the country's prosperity depended on expanding its population and resources, improving agricultural output, and fostering a work ethic among all inhabitants of the land.

García Peláez cautioned against the exploitation of communal lands, and his economic critique addressed issues such as colonial exploitation, the greed of the conquistadors and their descendants, forced labor, an unjust fiscal system, and the uneven distribution of land. Further arguing that the failure to establish Ladino settlements was due to the colonial elites' interests in maintaining the dispersion of the Ladino population through inconsistent application of colonial policies, hindering the establishment of what he believed could have been one to two hundred settlements. Decrees prohibited Ladinos from settling in indigenous towns and encouraged separate Ladino settlements and García Peláez criticized royal authorities for only allowing indigenous people to receive communal lands, forcing Ladinos to buy land, which contributed to their economic disadvantage.
