= Juan José de Aycinena y Piñol =

Juan José de Aycinena
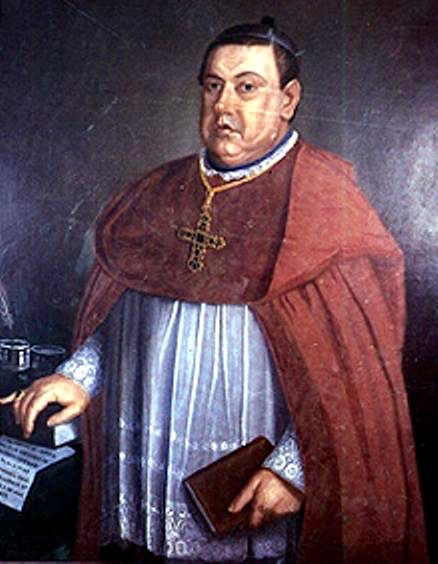
- Aycinena y Piñol as bishop

President of Pontificia Universidad de San Carlos Borromeo
- In office 1825–1829
- President: Manuel José Arce
- Governor: Mariano de Aycinena y Piñol (1827–1829)

Chief Minister of Guatemala
- In office 14 March 1842 – 11 December 1844
- Governor: Mariano Rivera Paz

President of Pontificia Universidad de San Carlos Borromeo
- In office 1840–1865
- Governor: Mariano Rivera Paz

Personal details
- Born: Juan José de Aycinena y Piñol; 29 August 1792 Guatemala City, Captaincy General of Guatemala, Spanish Empire
- Died: 15 February 1865 (aged 72) Guatemala City
- Party: Conservative
- Education: Pontificia Universidad de San Carlos

Juan José de Aycinena y Piñol
- Bishop of Trajanopolis
- Diocese: Trajanopolis
- See: Trajanopolis
- Appointed: 1859
- Installed: 1859
- Term ended: 1865

Personal details
- Profession: Statesman, nobleman

Ordination history of Juan José de Aycinena y Piñol
History
Priestly ordination
- Date: 1818

Juan José de Aycinena y Piñol (Guatemala City, 29 August 1792 – Guatemala City, 17 February 1865) was an ecclesiastical and intellectual conservative in Central America. He was President of the Pontifical University of San Carlos Borromeo from 1825 to 1829 and then of the Universidad Nacional from 1840 to 1865. He was a thinker criticized by liberal historians for his strong relationship with the conservative government of General Rafael Carrera and for eliminating the possibility of getting the Central American Union which the Liberals wanted. His participation in the government has been assessed more objectively in research conducted between 1980 and 2010. He was heir in 1814 to the noble title of III Marquess of Aycinena, and bishop in partibus of Trajanopolis from 1859. He had a taste for law, oratorical talent and wrote over twenty works.

== Biography ==
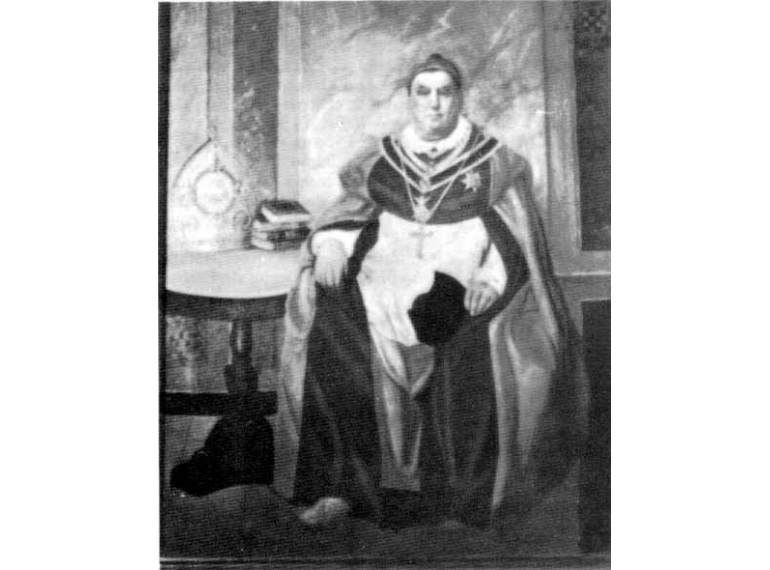
Aycinena in the 1850s.

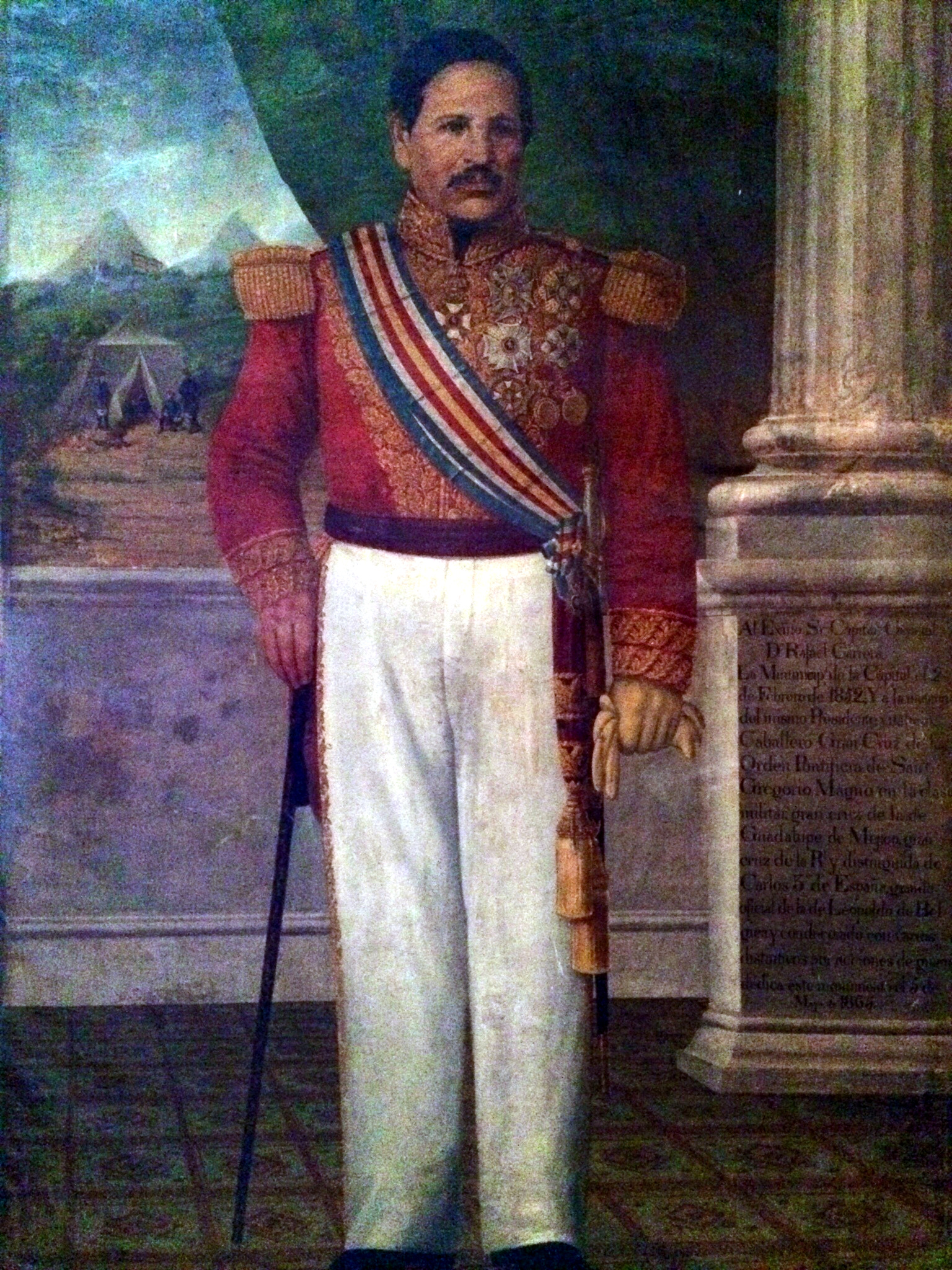
Captain General Rafael Carrera, president for life of Guatemala.

Born in Guatemala, on 29 August 1792. From age 22 took over the House of Aycinena and then was ordained when he was 26 years old. He may have received special education in the narrow circle of his family through preceptors, because he did not attend classes in the Tridentine Seminary, although frequently attended the benches of the university, and might have followed the courses taught by Luis de Escoto, OP. Then he studied at the Pontifical University of San Carlos of Guatemala, graduating from high school in Instituta and Law in 1811 and 1813 respectively. Later he received his doctorate in 1821.

As a priest was pastor of the Cathedral of Guatemala for four years, and became archbishop of attorney court. Obtained the Sagrario Parish in 1822 and, even though he had been prosecutor in the ecclesiastical curia for some years, took over as synodal judge Guatemala during the years 1824 to 1859.

He participated in the independence events in Central America in 1821, along with his uncle Mariano de Aycinena y Piñol, who was named by Manuel José Arce as Governor of Guatemala in 1827. When the liberal Honduran General Francisco Morazán invaded Guatemala in 1829, he overthrew and expelled Mariano family, the families in connection with the Aycinenas and regular orders of the Catholic Church. Aycinena y Piñol went first to Panama and then to the United States. While in America, Aycinena y Piñol wrote a series of documents collected in the book Toro Amarillo -Yellow Bull-, with which harshly criticized the liberal government of the Federation of United Provinces of Central America, directed by Morazán. He probably conceived in the US the possibility of creating a confessional republic.

Aycinena y Piñol returned to Guatemala in 1837. On his return he worked with the languishing Liberal government to restore order in the country. To that end drafted a "Declaration guarantees" which was very similar to the declaration of human rights statements made during the French Revolution; unfortunately, the results of his work were practically nil. Juan José Aycinena managed to get himself elected as a representative in the Interim Advisory Board, was a member of the Central Federal Congress in 1838 by the province of Totonicapán, and was chief minister during the regime of Mariano Rivera Paz, deputy of the Constituent Assembly of Guatemala on behalf of the university (1851–1856) and the Department of Verapaz (1856–1865). His ideas, his decisions, his writing, sketching, reflect a desire for social stability, and based on mainly Catholic values.

== Conservative government of Rafael Carrera ==
Along with other intellectuals of the Aycinena family of Guatemala, as Pavón and Luis Batres Juarros, Aycinena y Piñol favored military leader Rafael Carrera. When the latter consolidated his rule, Aycinena worked as deputy of the Constituent Assembly. In 1840 he was appointed again president of the Universidad Nacional. Ralph Woodward wrote of him: "During Rafael Carrera's presidency Piñol and his familia – who had strong ties to the Catholic Church, had an enormous influence on Guatemala's politics and education."

He worked as a public official in other positions, including Minister of Ecclesiastical Affairs and member of the Council of State (1855–1862) and was also behind the return of the Jesuits to Guatemala in 1851. Finally, was the inspiration for the first Concordat signed between an American National Government and the Holy See.

== Diocese ==
At the request of President Rafael Carrera, in 1859 he was consecrated bishop in partibus of Trajanopolis.

== Death ==
Died in February 1865, the same year as General Rafael Carrera.

== See also ==
- Catholic Church in Guatemala
