= Traianopolis (Phrygia) =

Ancient city in Phrygia

Coordinates: 38°41′10″N 29°32′49″E

Traianopolis, Trajanopolis, Tranopolis, or Tranupolis (Greek: Τραϊανούπολις) was a Roman and Byzantine city in Phrygia Pacatiana Prima.

Trajanopolis has been variously identified; Radet locates it at Çarikköy, about three miles from Giaurören towards the south-east, on the road from Uşak to Suzusköy, a village abounding in sculptures, marbles and fountains, where the name of the city may be read on the inscriptions. However, Ramsay continues to identify Trajanopolis with Giaurören. Modern scholars place it near Ortaköy.

== History ==
The only Ancient geographer who speaks of Trajanopolis is Claudius Ptolemy, who wrongly places this city in Greater Mysia (another region of Asia Minor).

It was founded about 109 by the Grimenothyritae, who obtained permission from Roman emperor Hadrian to give the place the name of his predecessor. It had its own coins. Hierocles calls it Tranopolis.

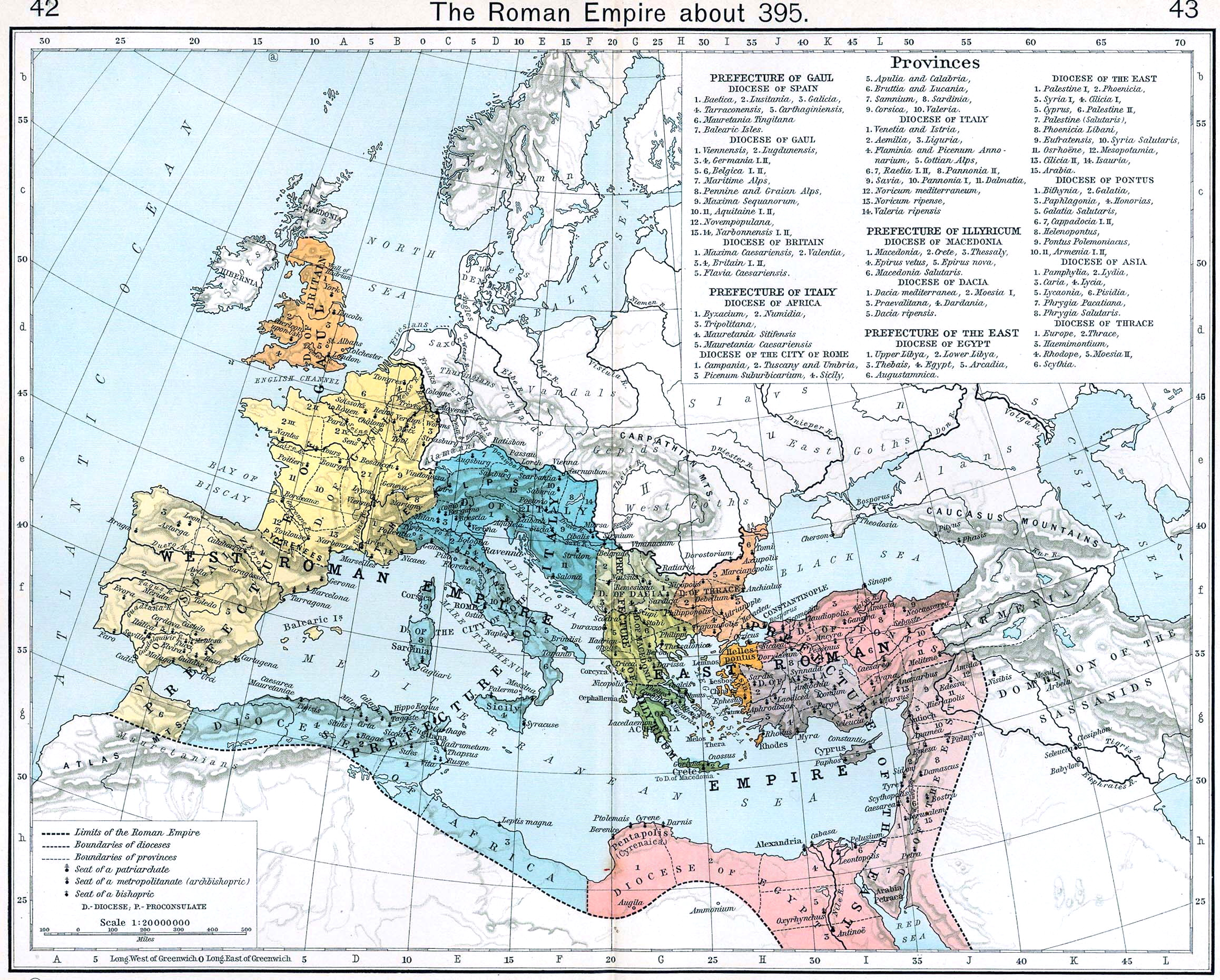
The Roman Empire and its administrative divisions, ca. 395. For a more detailed version, see this map.

== Ecclesiastical history ==
In the Notitiae Episcopatuum, Traianopolis is usually called Tranopolis, and is mentioned as an episcopal see up to the 13th century, among the suffragans of Laodicea, the capital and Metropolitan see of the Roman province of Phrygia Pacatiana Prima.

Le Quien names seven bishops of Trajanopolis:

- John, present at a Council of Constantinople in 459 under the Patriarch Gennadius I
- John, at the Council of Constantinople under Patriarch Menas in 536
- Asignius, at the Second Council of Constantinople in 553
- Tiberius, at the Council in Trullo in 692
- Philip, at the Second Council of Nicaea in 787
- Eustathius, at the Council of Constantinople (879-880).
- Another, doubtless more ancient than the preceding, Demetrius, is known from one inscription.

=== Titular see ===
The bishopric of Trajanopolis is included in the Catholic Church's list of titular sees, as the diocese was nominally restored in the 17th century as a titular bishopric, initially as just Traianopolis, renamed since 1933 Trajanopolis in Phrygia, thus avoiding confusion with its Thracian namesake (in Roman province Rhodope).

It is vacant, having had the following incumbents, of the lowest (episcopal) rank, with a singular archiepiscopal exception :

- Jerónimo Zolivera (1672-02-22 – 1683-01-11)
- Juan José de Aycinena y Piñol (1859-04-15 – 1865-02-17)
- Giulio Marsili, Friars Minor (O.F.M.) (1873-11-11 – 1873-11-11)
- Adam Carel Claessens (1874-06-16 – 1884-01-04) as Apostolic Vicar of Batavia (Java, Indonesia) (1874-06-16 – 1893-05-23), emeritate as Titular Archbishop of Siraces (1884-01-04 – 1895-07-10)
- Tomás Jenaro de Cámara y Castro, Augustinian Order (O.E.S.A.) (1883-08-09 – 1885-03-27)
- Piers Power (1886-01-29 – 1887-12-06)
- Louis-Hippolyte-Aristide Raguit (祁類思), Paris Foreign Missions Society (M.E.P.) (1888-03-23 – 1889-05-17)
- Titular Archbishop Enrico Giuseppe Reed da Silva (1898-03-24 – 1930-10-04), as emeritate; previously Titular Bishop of Philadelphia in Arabia (1884-03-17 – 1887-03-14), Bishop-Prelate of Territorial Prelature of Mozambique (Mozambique) (1884-03-27 – 1887-03-14), Bishop of São Tomé de Meliapor (India) (1887-03-14 – 1897-09-15)
- Agostino Laera (1931-07-24 – 1942-01-17)
- Felice Agostino Addeo, Augustinians (O.S.A.) (1942-07-01 – 1957-02-07)
- Humberto Lara Mejía, Vincentians (C.M.) (1957-07-19 – 1967-05-05)

== See also ==
- Traianopolis in Rhodope, a city and titular see in western Thrace

== Sources and external links ==
- GigaCatholic, with titular incumbent biography links
