= Rafael Carrera =

President of Guatemala

Captain General Rafael Carrera y Turcios GCSG
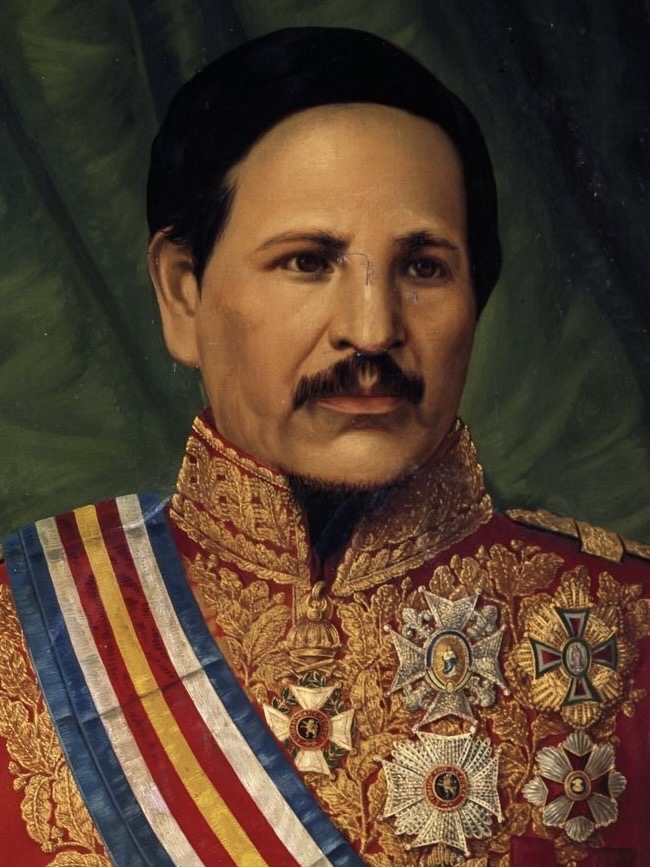

1st President of Guatemala
- In office 6 November 1851 – 14 April 1865
- Preceded by: Mariano Rivera Paz
- Succeeded by: Pedro de Aycinena y Piñol
- In office 21 March 1847 – 17 August 1848
- Preceded by: Position established
- Succeeded by: Juan Antonio Martínez

4th State President of Guatemala
- In office 4 December 1844 – 21 March 1847
- Preceded by: Mariano Paredes
- Succeeded by: Position abolished

Personal details
- Born: 24 October 1814 Guatemala City, Kingdom of Guatemala, New Spain
- Died: 14 April 1865 (aged 50) Guatemala City, Guatemala
- Party: Conservative
- Spouse: Petrona Garcia Morales de Carrera
- Children: José, Francisco, María Mercedes Carrera García
- Parent: Simón Carrera y Juana Turcios
- Occupation: Military

José Rafael Carrera y Turcios (24 October 1814 – 14 April 1865) was the president of Guatemala from 1844 to 1848 and from 1851 until his death in 1865, after being appointed president for life in 1854. He ruled during the establishment of new Central American nations and William Walker's invasions, liberal attempts to overthrow him, Mayan uprisings in the east, the Belize boundary dispute with the United Kingdom, and conflicts in Mexico under Benito Juárez. Carrera is seen as a caudillo, a term that refers to Latin American charismatic populist leaders of military background, sometimes among indigenous people.

Carrera became a dominant figure in Guatemala for three decades. He led a major revolt against the liberal government of Mariano Gálvez that marked the dissolution of Federal Republic of Central America. (Note: In Spanish: Republica Federal de Centroamérica.) After the liberals came back to power in Guatemala in 1871, Carrera's character and regime were dismissed and demonized, making him look as an illiterate who could not even write his own name manipulated by the anti-liberal faction. Over the years, even Marxist writers who wanted to show how the native Guatemalans have been exploited by elites completely ignored Carrera's support of them and accused him of racism and being a "little king".

== Early life ==
Carrera was born on 24 October 1814 in the Candelaria barrio of Guatemala City towards the end of the Spanish colonial period. He was of humble origin, a mestizo and illiterate. He first worked as a farmhand. He enlisted in the army during the civil war, which lasted from 1826 to 1829. In 1835, he left the army and moved to Mataquescuintla where he married Petrona García and worked as a swineherd.

== Rise to power ==
By 1837, rural masses were voicing numerous grievances against the liberal government of Guatemala that led to an uprising. A cholera epidemic added to the frustration and helped Carrera rally the peasants into an armed resistance that was strongly supported by clerics of the Catholic Church, with Carrera becoming de facto ruler of much of Guatemala, leading both indigenous and poor peasants of mixed race in the east and south of the country, an area that was known as The Mountain. The movement was strongly pro-Catholic and wanted to restore part of the colonial traditions that the liberals had abandoned. Francisco Morazán repeatedly drove Carrera's forces out of cities and towns, but Carrera's followers would retake places as soon as Morazán's army left. Carrera became a respected military commander in the decade that followed.

Although conservatives criollos from the Aycinena Clan like Juan José de Aycinena y Piñol distrusted him, they decided to support Carrera in an attempt at reversing some of the liberal gains of 1829 after Morazán's invasion of Guatemala.

=== Battles with Morazán ===
Carrera is often portrayed as a "guerrilla" leader but an analysis of his military campaigns between 1837 and 1840 shows that they were closer to hybrid warfare. While his soldiers were not well equipped, their training in the local militias, going back to colonial times and the civil war that followed independence from Spain, enabled them to successfully fight conventional battles against the numerically superior forces of the Guatemalan and Federal governments. In 1838 the liberal forces of Morazán and José Francisco Barrundia invaded Guatemala and reached San Sur, where they executed Pascual García, Carrera's father-in-law. They impaled his head on a pike as a warning to all followers of the Guatemalan caudillo. On learning this, Carrera and his wife Petrona – who had come to confront Morazán as soon as they learned of the invasion and were in Mataquescuintla – swore they would never forgive Morazán even in his grave; they felt it impossible to respect anyone who would not avenge family members. After sending several envoys, whom Carrera would not receive – especially Barrundia whom Carrera did not want to murder in cold blood – Morazán began a scorched earth offensive, destroying villages and taking away their few assets. The Carrera forces had to hide in the mountains . Believing that Carrera was totally defeated, Morazán and Barrundia marched on to Guatemala City, where they were welcomed as saviors by the state governor Pedro Valenzuela and members of the conservative Aycinena Clan, who proposed to sponsor one of the liberal battalions, while Valenzuela and Barrundia gave Morazán all the Guatemalan resources needed to solve any financial problem he had. The criollos of both parties celebrated until dawn that they finally had a criollo caudillo like Morazán, who was able to crush the peasant rebellion.

Morazán used the proceeds to support Los Altos and then replaced Valenzuela by Mariano Rivera Paz, member of the Aycinena clan, although he did not return to that clan any property confiscated in 1829; in revenge, Juan José de Aycinena y Piñol voted for the dissolution of the Central American Federation in San Salvador a little later, forcing Morazán to return to El Salvador to fight to save his federal mandate. Along the way, Morazán increased repression in eastern Guatemala, as punishment for helping Carrera. Knowing that Morazán had gone to El Salvador, Carrera tried to take Salamá with the small force that remained, but was defeated, losing his brother Laureano in the combat. With just a few men left, he managed to escape, badly wounded, to Sanarate. Under conventional warfare conditions, this defeat would have ended Carrera's military campaign. However, by this time the young commander had already become accustomed to disassemble and regroup, not just after defeats but also after victories. Carrera's pursuit of a military approach that combined alternately guerrilla and conventional warfare enabled him to reconstitute his forces while keeping some degree of pressure on the government. Without any permanent means of financing the struggle, Carrera was able to bring together large forces for significant operations, and then send his soldiers back to their farms after engagement. The government, on the other hand, had to spend precious resources fielding permanent forces. After recovering to some extent, he attacked a detachment in Jutiapa and managed to get a small amount of booty which he handed to the volunteers who accompanied him and prepared to attack Petapa – near Guatemala City – where he was victorious, though with heavy casualties. In September of that year, he attempted an assault on the capital of Guatemala, but the liberal general Carlos Salazar Castro defeated him in the fields of Villa Nueva and Carrera had to retreat. After an unsuccessful attempt to take the Quetzaltenango, Carrera was surrounded and wounded, and he had to capitulate to the Mexican General Agustin Guzman, who had been in Quetzaltenango since the time of Vicente Filísola's arrival in 1823. Morazán had the opportunity to shoot Carrera, but did not because he needed the support of the Guatemalan peasants to counter the attacks of Francisco Ferrera in El Salvador; instead, Morazán left Carrera in charge of a small fort in Mita, and without any weapons. Knowing that Morazán was going to attack El Salvador, Francisco Ferrera gave arms and ammunition to Carrera and convinced him to attack Guatemala City.

Meanwhile, despite insistent advice to definitely crush Carrera and his forces, Salazar tried to negotiate with him diplomatically; he even went as far as to show that he neither feared nor distrusted Carrera by removing the fortifications of the Guatemalan capital, in place in since the battle of Villa Nueva. Taking advantage of Salazar's good faith and Ferrera's weapons, Carrera took Guatemala City by surprise on April 13, 1839; Castro Salazar, Mariano Gálvez and Barrundia fled before the arrival of Carrera's militia men. Salazar, in his nightshirt, vaulted roofs of neighboring houses and sought refuge; reaching the border disguised as a peasant. With Salazar gone, Carrera reinstated Rivera Paz as Head of State of Guatemala.

=== Invasion and absorption of Los Altos ===
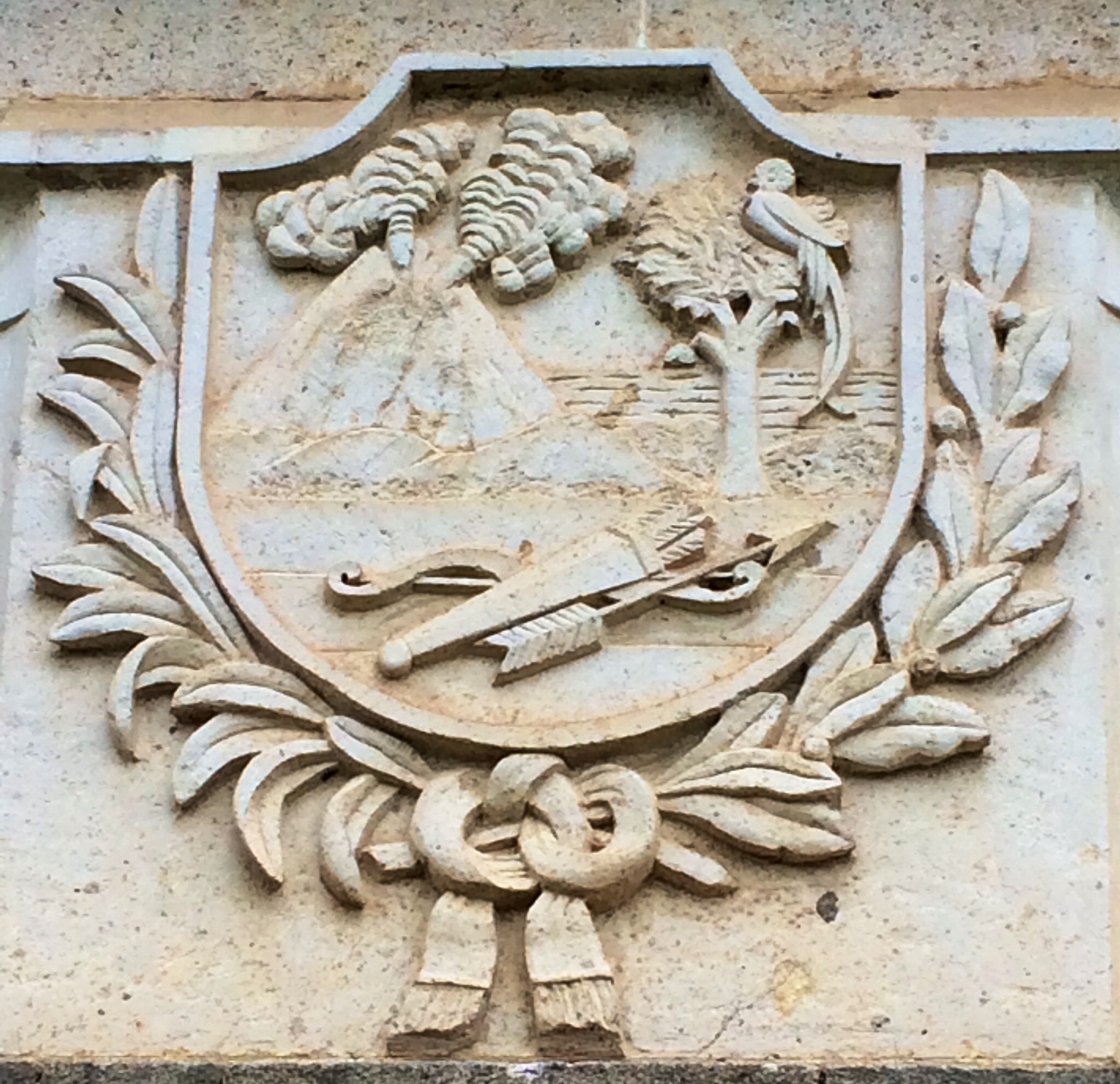
State Coat of Los Altos, carved in stone on the grave of heroes in the Cemetery of Quetzaltenango

On April 2, 1838, in the city of Quetzaltenango, a secessionist group founded the independent State of Los Altos which sought independence from Guatemala. The most important members of the Liberal Party of Guatemala and liberal enemies of the conservative regime moved to Los Altos, leaving their exile in El Salvador. The liberals in Los Altos began severely criticizing the Conservative government of Rivera Paz; they had their own newspaper – El Popular, which contributed to the harsh criticism. Moreover, Los Altos was the region with the main production and economic activity of the former state of Guatemala; without Los Altos, conservatives lost much of the resources that had given Guatemala hegemony in Central America. Then, the government of Guatemala tried to reach to a peaceful solution, but altenses, (Note: Altenses is how people from Quetzaltenango are known in Guatemala.) protected by the recognition of the Central American Federation Congress, did not accept; Guatemala's government then resorted to force, sending Carrera as commanding general of the Army to subdue Los Altos.

Carrera defeated General Agustin Guzman when the former Mexican officer tried to ambush him and then went on to Quetzaltenango, where he imposed a harsh and hostile conservative regime instead of the liberals. Calling all council members, he told them flatly that he was behaving leniently towards them as it was the first time they had challenged him, but sternly warned them that there would be no mercy if there was a second time. Finally, Guzmán, and the head of state of Los Altos, Marcelo Molina, were sent to the capital of Guatemala, where they were displayed as trophies of war during a triumphant parade on February 17, 1840; in the case of Guzman, shackled, still with bleeding wounds, and riding a mule.

=== Morazán Second Invasion of Guatemala ===
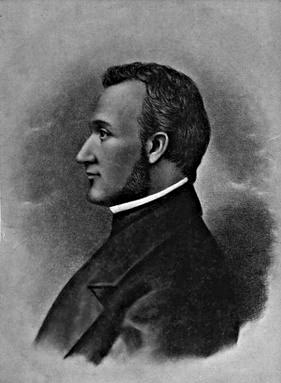
General Francisco Morazán tried to invade Guatemala for the second time in 1840 after having invaded in 1829 and expelled members of the Aycinena clan and regular orders. In 1840 he was defeated overwhelmingly by Carrera, marking the end of his career in Central America

On March 18, 1840, liberal caudillo Morazán invaded Guatemala with 1500 soldiers to avenge the insult done in Los Altos. Fearing that such action would end with liberal efforts to hold together the Central American Federation, Guatemala had a cordon of guards from the border with El Salvador; without a telegraph service, men ran carrying last-minute messages. With the information from these messengers, Carrera hatched a plan of defense leaving his brother Sotero in charge of troops who presented only slight resistance in the city. Carrera pretended to flee and led his ragtag army to the heights of Aceituno, with few men, few rifles and two old cannons. The city was at the mercy of the army of Morazán, with bells of the twenty churches ringing for divine assistance. Once Morazán reached the capital, he took it easily and freed Guzman, who immediately left for Quetzaltenango to give the news that Carrera was defeated; Carrera then, taking advantage of what his enemies believed, applied a strategy of concentrating fire on the Central Park of the city and also employed surprise attack tactics which caused heavy casualties to the army of Morazán, finally forcing the survivors to fight for their lives. (Note: Among those fighting in these battles was the famous Guatemalan poet José Batres Montúfar) Morazán's soldiers lost the initiative and their previous numerical superiority. Furthermore, in unfamiliar surroundings in the city, they had to fight, carry their dead and care for their wounded while resentful and tired from the long march from El Salvador to Guatemala. Carrera, by then an experienced military man, was able to defeat Morazán thoroughly.

The disaster for the liberal general was complete: aided by Angel Molina (Note: Angel Molina was the son of Guatemalan Liberal leader Pedro Molina Mazariegos.) who knew the streets of the city, had to flee with his favorite men, disguised, shouting "Long live Carrera!" through the ravine of El Incienso to El Salvador. In his absence, Morazán had been supplanted as Head of State of his country, and had to embark for exile in Peru. In Guatemala, survivors from his troops were shot without mercy, while Carrera was out in unsuccessful pursuit of Morazan. This engagement sealed the status of Carrera and marked the decline of Morazán, and forced the conservative Aycinena clan criollos to negotiate with Carrera and his peasant revolutionary supporters.

Guzmán, who was freed by Morazán when the latter had seemingly defeated Carrera in Guatemala City, had gone back to Quetzaltenango to bring the good news. The city liberal criollo leaders rapidly reinstated the Los Altos State and celebrated Morazán's victory. However, as soon as Carrera and the newly reinstated Mariano Rivera Paz heard the news, Carrera went back to Quetzaltenango with his volunteer army to regain control of the rebel liberal state once and for all. On April 2, 1840, after entering the city, Carrera told the citizens that he had already warned them after he defeated them earlier that year. Then, he ordered the majority of the liberal city hall officials from Los Altos to be shot. Carrera then forcibly annexed Quetzaltenango and much of Los Altos back into conservative Guatemala. After the violent and bloody reinstatement of the State of Los Altos by Carrera in April 1840, Luis Batres Juarros – conservative member of the Aycinena Clan, then secretary general of the Guatemalan government of recently reinstated Mariano Rivera Paz – obtained from the vicar Larrazabal authorization to dismantle the regionalist Church. Serving priests of Quetzaltenango – capital of the would-be-state of Los Altos, Urban Ugarte and his coadjutor, José Maria Aguilar, were removed from their parish and likewise the priests of the parishes of San Martin Jilotepeque and San Lucas Tolimán. Larrazabal ordered the priests Fernando Antonio Dávila, Mariano Navarrete and Jose Ignacio Iturrioz to cover the parishes of Quetzaltenango, San Martin Jilotepeque and San Lucas Toliman, respectively.

The liberal criollos' defeat and execution in Quetzaltenango enhanced Carrera's status with the native population of the area, whom he respected and protected.

=== Belgian colony ===
In 1840, Belgium began to act as an external source of support for Carrera's independence movement, in an effort to exert influence in Central America. The Compagnie belge de colonisation (Belgian Colonization Company), commissioned by Belgian King Leopold I, became the administrator of Santo Tomas de Castilla in Izabal replacing the failed British Eastern Coast of Central America Commercial and Agricultural Company. Even though the colony eventually crumbled due to the endemic diseases that plagued the area, Belgium continued to support Carrera in the mid-19th century, although Britain continued to be the main business and political partner to Carrera's regime.

Belgian colonization company in 1844

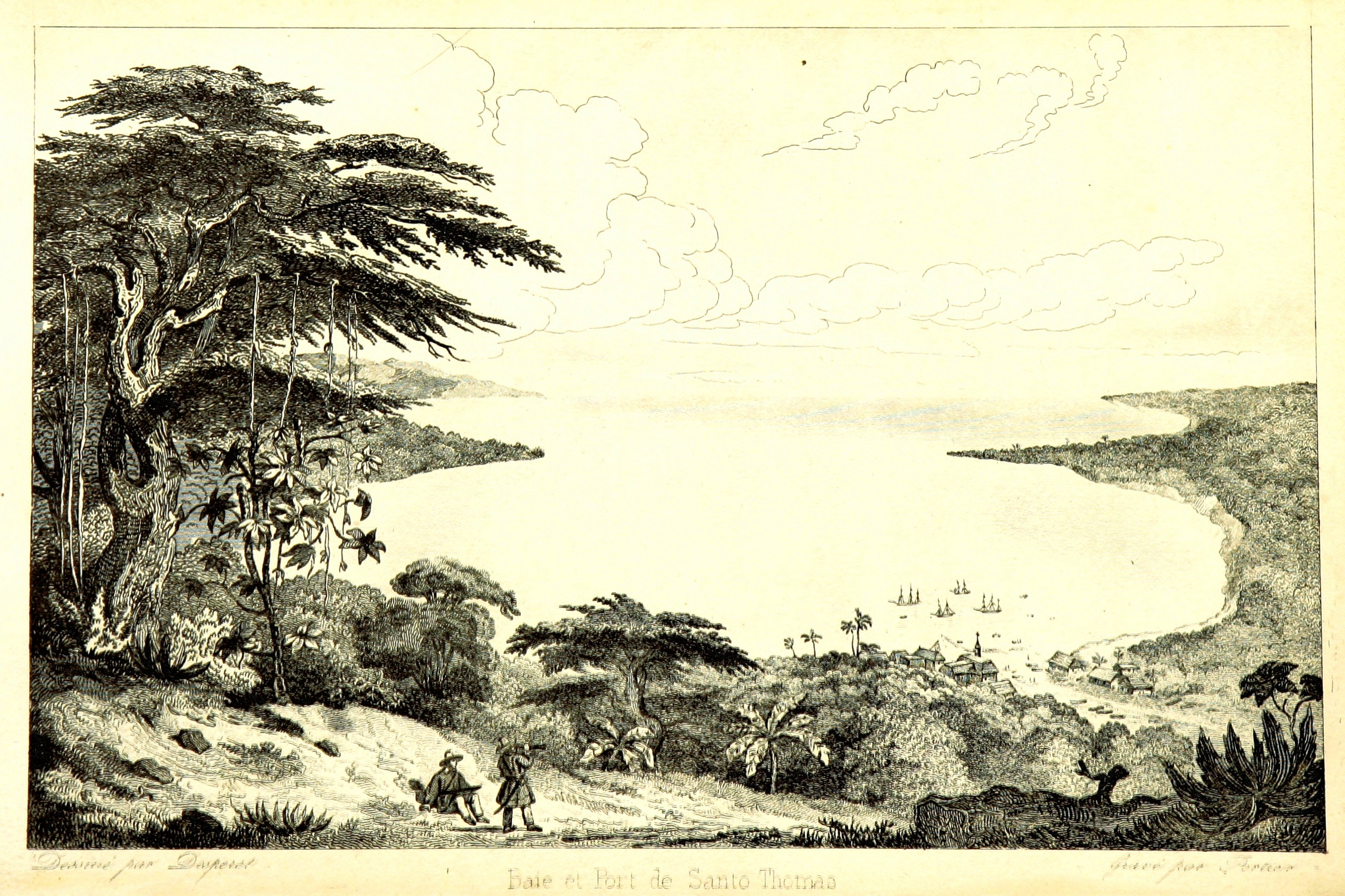
Santo Tomás de Castilla bay

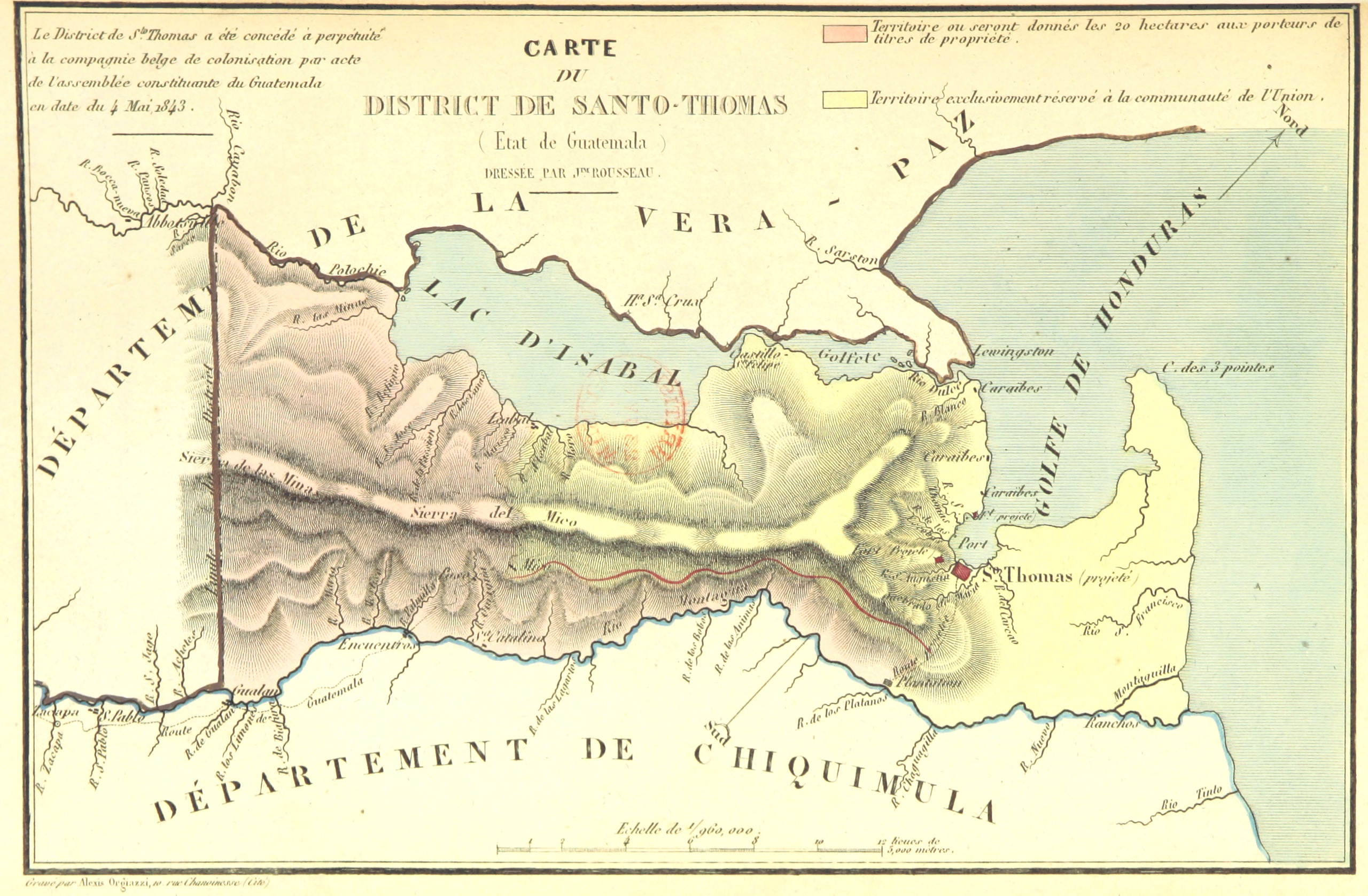
Izabal lake and Santo Tomás district. Area in yellow is what had been given in perpetuity to the catholic Belgians by Carrera's regime.

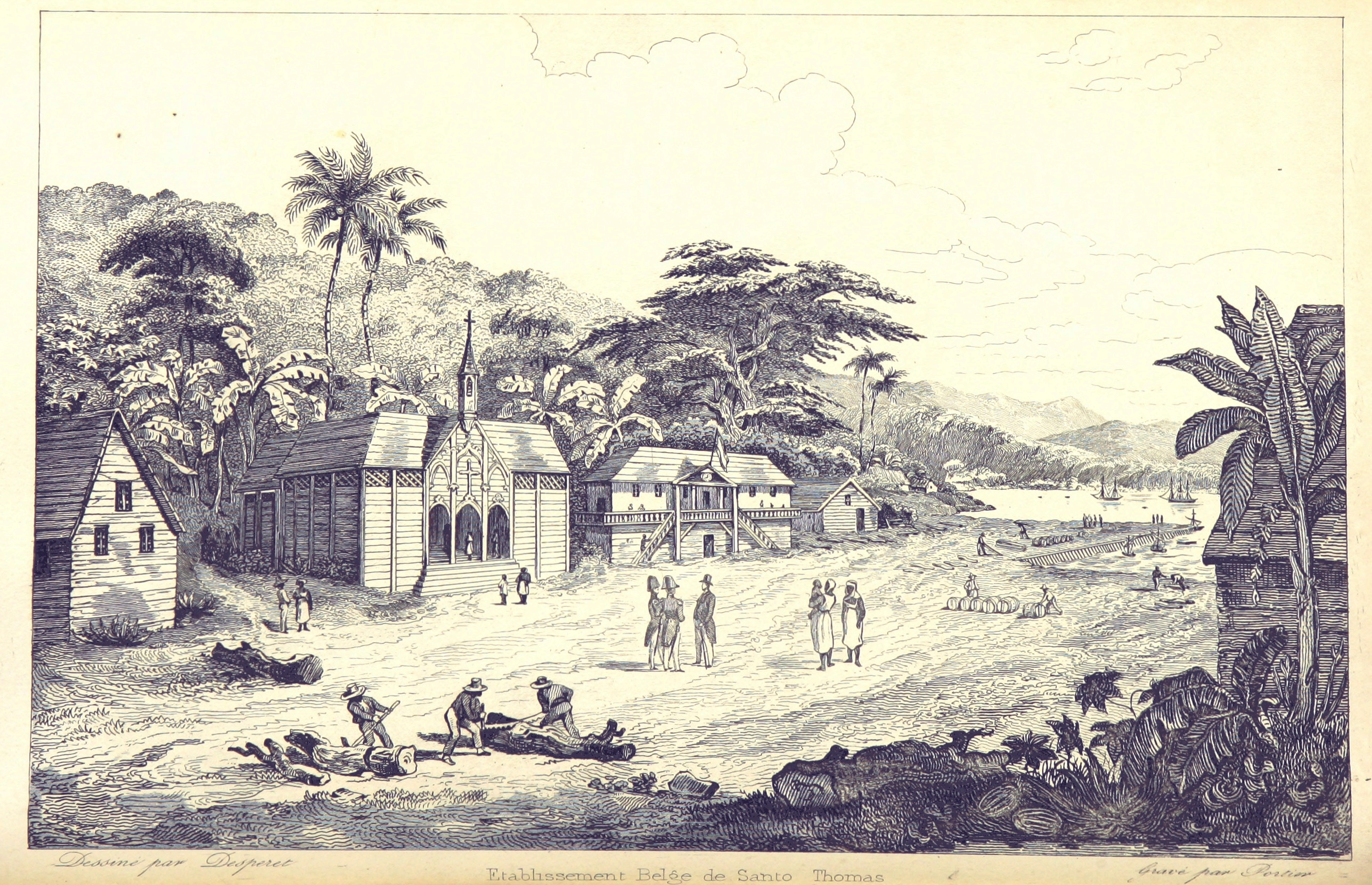
Santo Tomás town

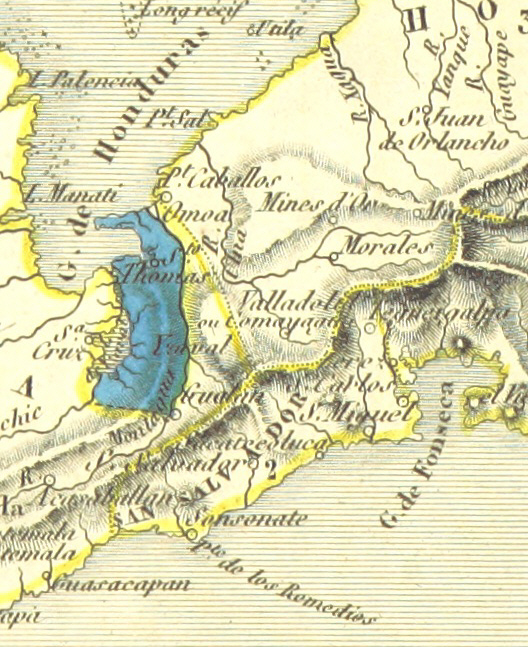
Map of the Belgian colony in Guatemala.

Maps and drawings made by Belgians. One of the descendent of the first settlers from 1844 is Oscar Berger Perdomo who was President of Guatemala between 2004 and 2008.

== First presidency ==
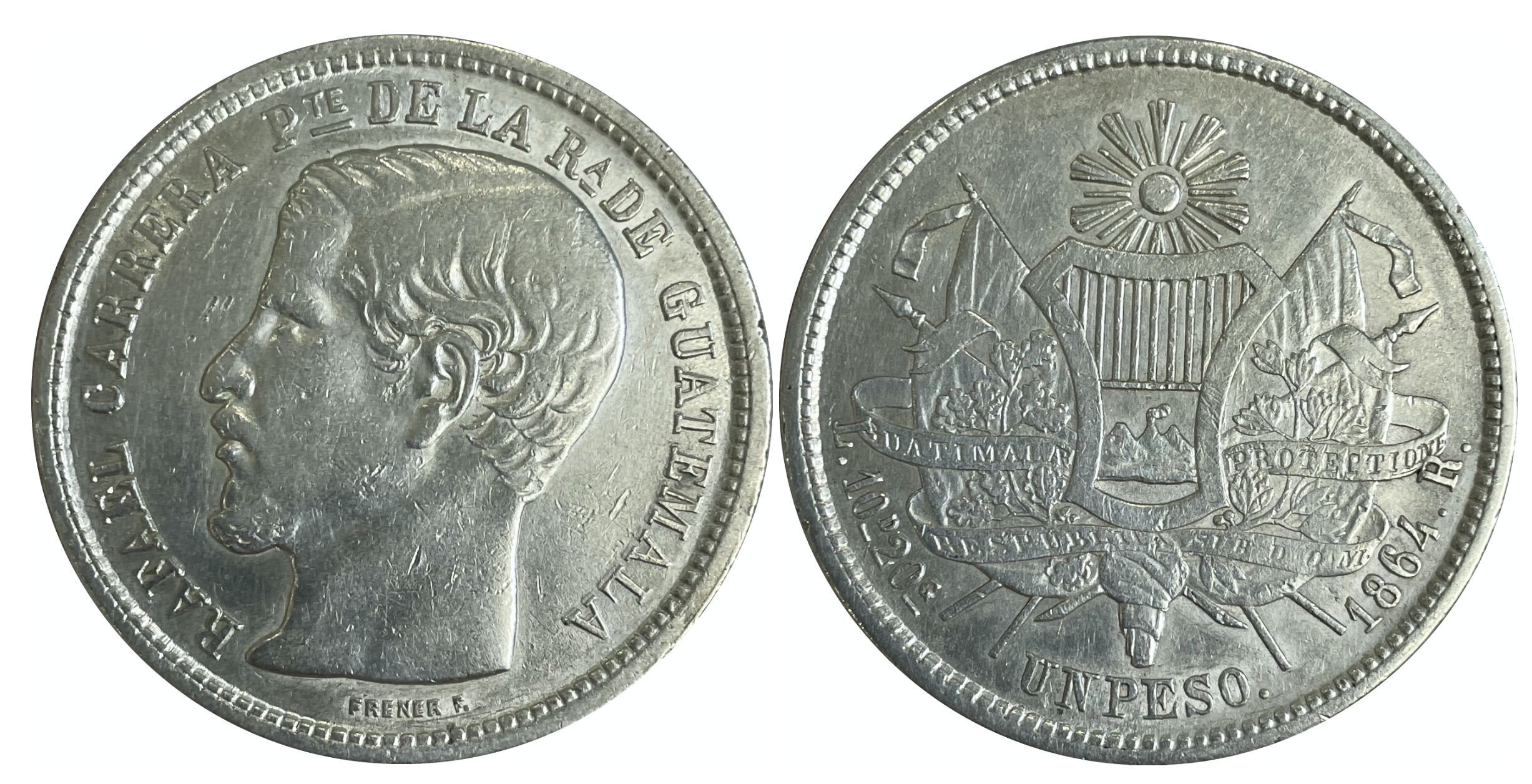
Silver coin: 1 peso Guatemala 1864, with the portrait of Rafael Carrera

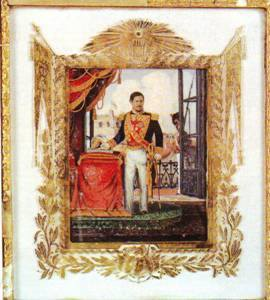
General Carrera portrait celebrating the foundation of the Republic of Guatemala in 1847.

Rafael Carrera was appointed president in 1844 and on March 21, 1847, by executive order declared Guatemala an independent republic, becoming its first president.

=== Caste War of Yucatán ===
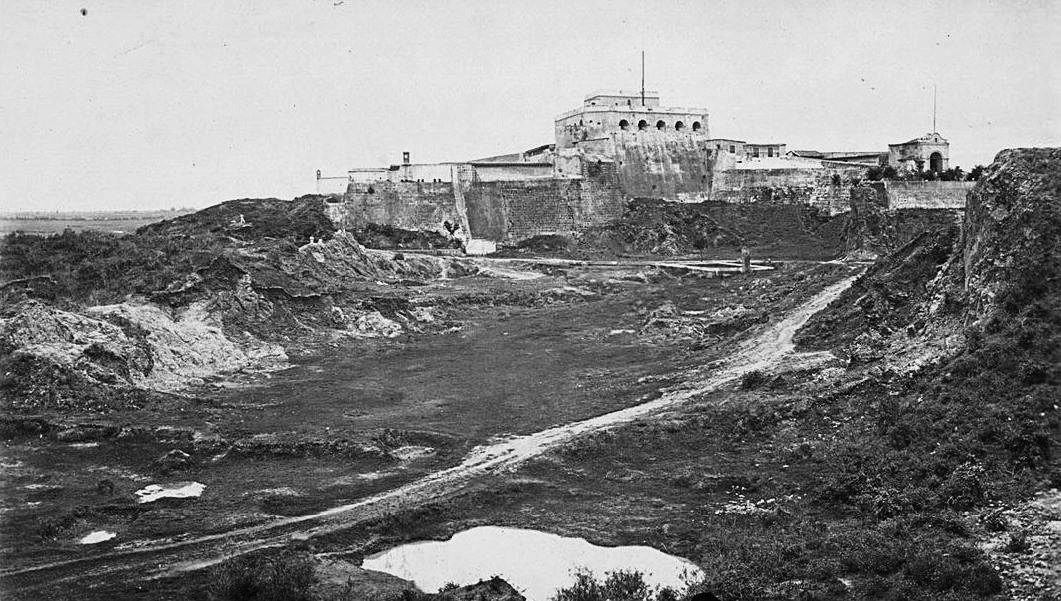
San José castle. Carrera built this military base to defend Guatemala City.

In Yucatán, then an independent republic north of Guatemala, a war started between the natives and the mestizo and criollo populations; this war seemed rooted in the defense of communal lands against the expansion of private ownership, which was accentuated by the boom in the production of henequén, which was an important industrial fiber used to make rope. After discovering the value of the plant, the wealthier Yucateco criollos (local-born Spaniards) started plantations, beginning in 1833, to cultivate it on a large scale; not long after the henequen boom, a boom in sugar production led to more wealth. The sugar and henequén plantations encroached on native communal land, and native workers recruited to work on the plantations were mistreated and underpaid.

However, rebel leaders in their correspondence with British Honduras (Belize) were more often inclined to cite taxation as the immediate cause of the war; Jacinto Pat, for example, wrote in 1848 that "what we want is liberty and not oppression, because before we were subjugated with the many contributions and taxes that they imposed on us." Pac's companion, Cecilio Chi added in 1849, that promises made by the rebel Santiago Imán, that he was "liberating the Indians from the payment of contributions" as a reason for resisting the central government, but in fact he continued levying them.

In June 1847, Méndez learned that a large force of armed natives and supplies had gathered at the Culumpich, a property owned by Jacinto Pat, the Maya batab (leader), near Valladolid. Fearing revolt, Mendez arrested Manuel Antonio Ay, the principal Maya leader of Chichimilá, accused of planning a revolt, and executed him at the town square of Valladolid. Furthermore, Méndez searching for other insurgents burned the town of Tepich and repressed its residents. In the following months, several Maya towns were sacked and many people arbitrarily killed. In his letter of 1849, Cecilio Chi noted that Santiago Mendez had come to "put every Indian, big and little, to death" but that the Maya had responded to some degree, in kind, writing "it has pleased God and good fortune that a much greater portion of them [whites] than of the Indians [have died].

Cecilio Chi, the native leader of Tepich, along with Jacinto Pat attacked Tepich on 30 July 1847, in reaction to the indiscriminate massacre of Mayas, ordered that all the non-Maya population be killed. By spring of 1848, the Maya forces had taken over most of the Yucatán, with the exception of the walled cities of Campeche and Mérida and the south-west coast, with Yucatecan troops holding the road from Mérida to the port of Sisal. The Yucatecan governor Miguel Barbachano had prepared a decree for the evacuation of Mérida, but was apparently delayed in publishing it by the lack of suitable paper in the besieged capital. The decree became unnecessary when the republican troops suddenly broke the siege and took the offensive with major advances.

Governor Barbachano sought allies anywhere he could find them, in Cuba (for Spain), Jamaica (for the United Kingdom) and the United States, but none of these foreign powers would intervene, although the matter was taken seriously enough in the United States to be debated in Congress. Subsequently, therefore, he turned to Mexico, and accepted a return to Mexican authority. Yucatán was officially reunited with Mexico on 17 August 1848. Yucateco forces rallied, aided by fresh guns, money, and troops from Mexico, and pushed back the natives from more than half of the state.

By 1850, the natives occupied two distinct regions in the southeast and they were inspired to continue the struggle by the apparition of the "Talking Cross". This apparition, believed to be a way in which God communicated with the Maya, dictated that the War continue. Chan Santa Cruz, or Small Holy Cross became the religious and political center of the Maya resistance and the rebellion came to be infused with religious significance. Chan Santa Cruz also became the name of the largest of the independent Maya states, as well as the name of the capital city which is now the city of Felipe Carrillo Puerto, Quintana Roo. The followers of the Cross were known as the "Cruzob".

The government of Yucatán first declared the war over in 1855, but hopes for peace were premature. There were regular skirmishes, and occasional deadly major assaults into each other's territory, by both sides. The United Kingdom recognized the Chan Santa Cruz Maya as a "de facto" independent nation, in part because of the major trade between Chan Santa Cruz and British Honduras.

=== Brief exile to Mexico ===
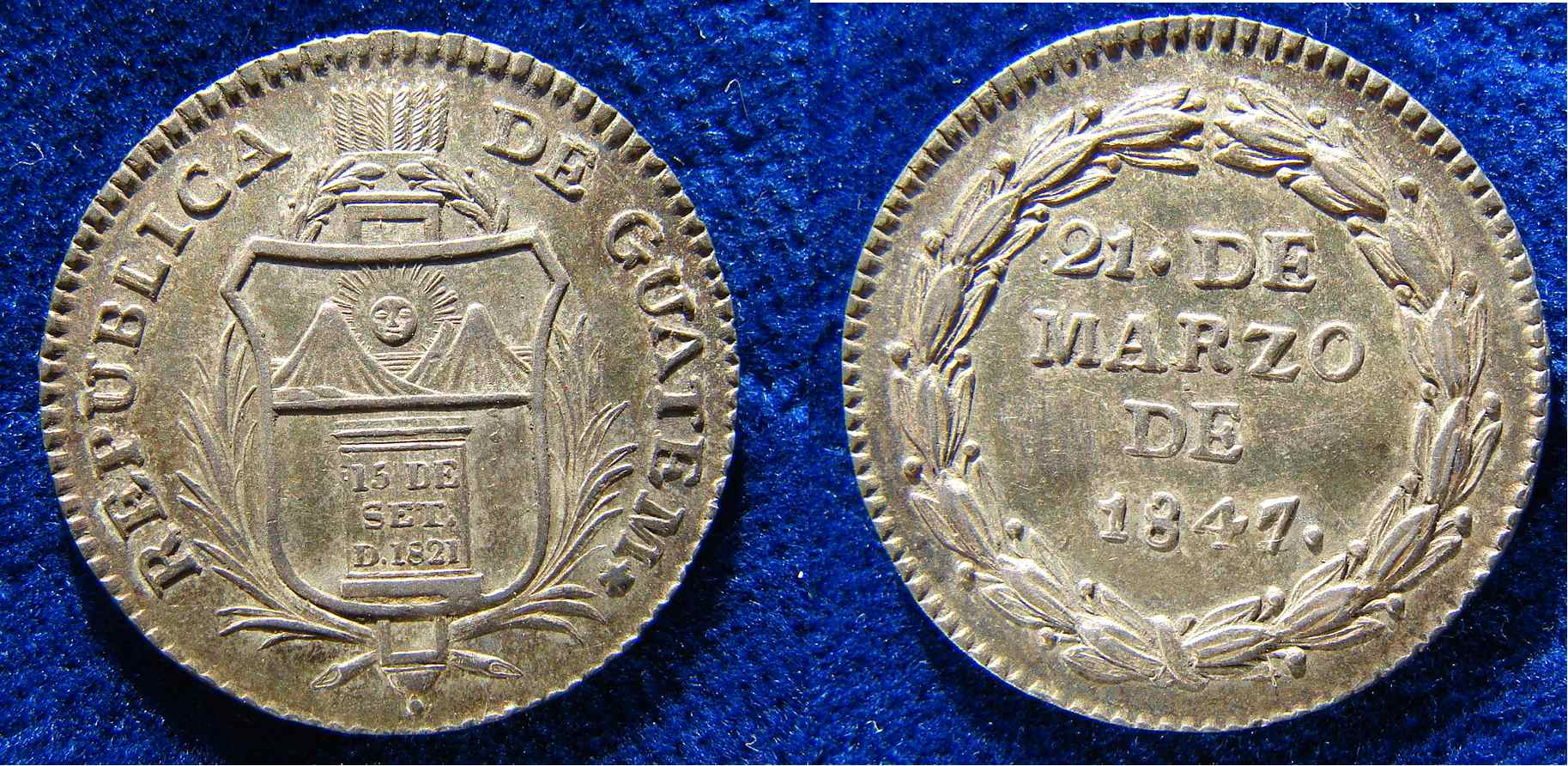
Proclamation Coin 1847 of the independent Republic of Guatemala

During the first term as president, Carrera had brought the country back from extreme conservatism to a traditional moderation and kept a stable relationship among the natives, the criollos—who at the time were terrified of the Caste War in Yucatán—and himself; but in 1848, the liberals were able to drive him from office, after the country had been in turmoil for several months. Carrera resigned of his own free will and left for México. The new liberal regime allied itself with the Aycinena family and swiftly passed a law ordering Carrera's execution if he dared to return to Guatemalan soil. The liberal criollos from Quetzaltenango were led by general Agustín Guzmán who occupied the city after Corregidor general Mariano Paredes was called to Guatemala City to take over the presidential office. They declared on 26 August 1848 that Los Altos was an independent state once again. The new state had the support of Vasconcelos' regime in El Salvador and the rebel guerrilla army of Vicente and Serapio Cruz who were sworn enemies of Carrera. The interim government was led by Guzmán himself and had Florencio Molina and the priest Fernando Davila as his Cabinet members. On 5 September 1848, the criollos altenses chose a formal government led by Fernando Antonio Martínez.

=== Back to Guatemala ===
In the meantime, Carrera decided to return to Guatemala and did so entering by Huehuetenango, where he met with the native leaders and told them that they must remain united to prevail; the leaders agreed and slowly the segregated native communities started developing a new Indian identity under Carrera's leadership. In the meantime, in the eastern part of Guatemala, the Jalapa region became increasingly dangerous; former president Mariano Rivera Paz and rebel leader Vicente Cruz were both murdered there after trying to take over the Corregidor office in 1849.

When Carrera arrived to Chiantla in Huehuetenango, he received two altenses emissaries who told him that their soldiers were not going to fight his forces because that would lead to a native revolt, much like that of 1840; their only request from Carrera was to keep the natives under control. The altenses did not comply, and led by Guzmán and his forces, they started chasing Carrera; the caudillo hid helped by his native allies and remained under their protection when the forces of Miguel Garcia Granados – who arrived from Guatemala City were looking for him.

On learning that officer José Víctor Zavala had been appointed as Corregidor in Suchitepéquez, Carrera and his hundred jacalteco bodyguards crossed a dangerous jungle infested with jaguars to meet his former friend. When they met, Zavala not only did not capture him, but agreed to serve under his orders, thus sending a strong message to both liberal and conservatives in Guatemala City that they would have to negotiate with Carrera or battle on two fronts – Quetzaltenango and Jalapa. Carrera went back to the Quetzaltenango area, while Zavala remained in Suchitepéquez as a tactical maneuver. Carrera received a visit from a Cabinet member of Paredes and told him that he had control of the native population and that he assured Paredes that he would keep them appeased. When the emissary returned to Guatemala City, he told the president everything Carrera said, and added that the native forces were formidable.

Guzmán went to Antigua Guatemala to meet with another group of Paredes emissaries; they agreed that Los Altos would rejoin Guatemala, and that the latter would help Guzmán defeat his hated enemy and also build a port on the Pacific Ocean. Guzmán was sure of victory this time, but his plan evaporated when, in his absence, Carrera and his native allies had occupied Quetzaltenango; Carrera appointed Ignacio Yrigoyen as Corregidor and convinced him that he should work with the k'iche', mam, q'anjobal and mam leaders to keep the region under control. On his way out, Yrigoyen murmured to a friend: Now he is the King of the Indians, indeed!

Guzmán then left for Jalapa, where he struck a deal with the rebels, while Luis Batres Juarros convinced president Paredes to deal with Carrera. Back in Guatemala City within a few months, Carrera was commander-in-chief, backed by military and political support of the Indian communities from the densely populated western highlands. During the first presidency from 1844 to 1848, he brought the country back from excessive conservatism to a moderate regime, and – with the advice of Juan José de Aycinena y Piñol and Pedro de Aycinena – restored relations with the Church in Rome with a Concordat ratified in 1854.

== Second presidency ==
=== Battle of La Arada ===
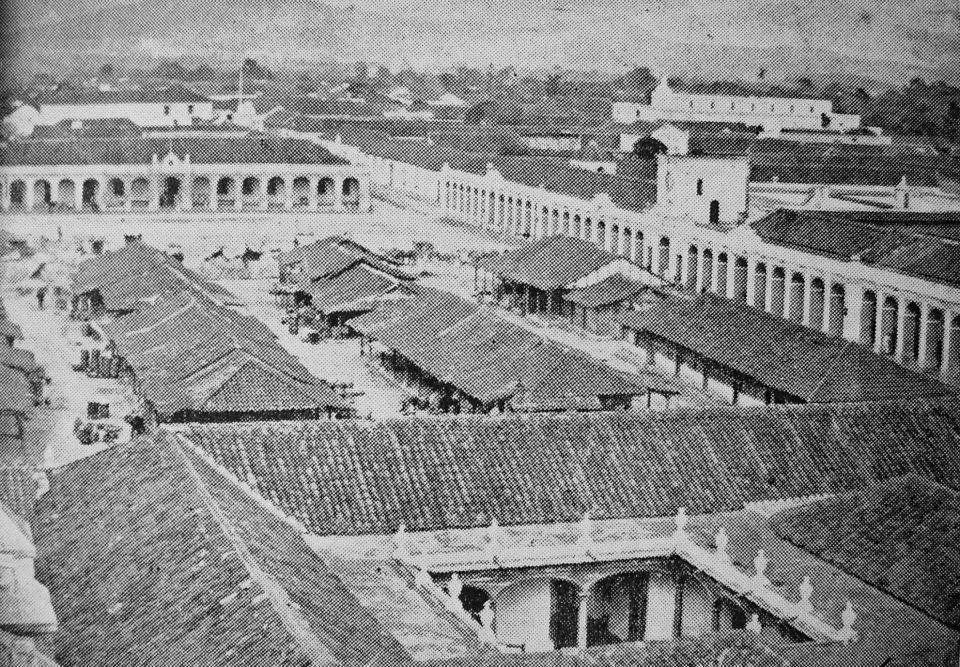
Guatemala City Central Square during the Carrera administration.

After Carrera returned from exile in 1849, Vasconcelos granted asylum to the Guatemalan liberals, who harassed the Guatemalan government in several different forms: José Francisco Barrundia did it through a liberal newspaper established with that specific goal; Vasconcelos gave support during a whole year to a rebel faction "La Montaña", in eastern Guatemala, providing and distributing money and weapons. By late 1850, Vasconcelos was getting impatient at the slow progress of the war with Guatemala and decided to plan an open attack. Under that circumstance, the Salvadorean head of state started a campaign against the conservative Guatemalan regime, inviting Honduras and Nicaragua to participate in the alliance; only the Honduran government led by Juan Lindo accepted.

Meanwhile, in Guatemala, where the invasion plans were perfectly well known, President Mariano Paredes started taking precautions to face the situation, while the Guatemalan Archbishop, Francisco de Paula García Peláez, ordered peace prayers in the archdiocese. (Note: In the Conservative regime of Guatemala, the Catholic Church was entangled with the Government and the leaders of both were relatives, mostly of the Aycinena family.)

On 4 January 1851, Doroteo Vasconcelos and Juan Lindo met in Ocotepeque, Honduras, where they signed an alliance against Guatemala. The Salvadorean army had 4,000 men, properly trained and armed and supported by artillery; the Honduran army numbered 2,000 men. The coalition army was stationed in Metapán, El Salvador, due to its proximity with both the Guatemalan and Honduran borders.

On 28 January 1851, Vasconcelos sent a letter to the Guatemalan Ministry of Foreign Relations, in which he demanded that the Guatemalan president relinquish power, so that the alliance could designate a new head of state loyal to the liberals and that Carrera be exiled, escorted to any of the Guatemalan southern ports by a Salvadorean regiment. The Guatemalan government did not accept the terms and the Allied army entered Guatemalan territory at three different places. On 29 January, a 500-man contingent entered through Piñuelas, Agua Blanca and Jutiapa, led by General Vicente Baquero, but the majority of the invading force marched from Metapán. The Allied army was composed of 4,500 men led by Vasconcelos, as Commander in Chief. Other commanders were the generals José Santos Guardiola, Ramón Belloso, José Trinidad Cabañas and Gerardo Barrios. Guatemala was able to recruit 2,000 men, led by Lieutenant General Carrera as Commander in Chief, with several colonels.

Carrera's strategy was to feign a retreat, forcing the enemy forces to follow the "retreating" troops to a place he had previously chosen; on February 1, 1851, both armies were facing each other with only the San José river between them. Carrera had fortified the foothills of La Arada, its summit about 50 metres (160 ft) above the level of the river. A meadow 300 metres (980 ft) deep lay between the hill and the river, and boarding the meadow was a sugar cane plantation. Carrera divided his army in three sections: the left wing was led by Cerna and Solares; the right wing led by Bolaños. He personally led the central battalion, where he placed his artillery. Five hundred men stayed in Chiquimula to defend the city and to aid in a possible retreat, leaving only 1,500 Guatemalans against an enemy of 4,500.

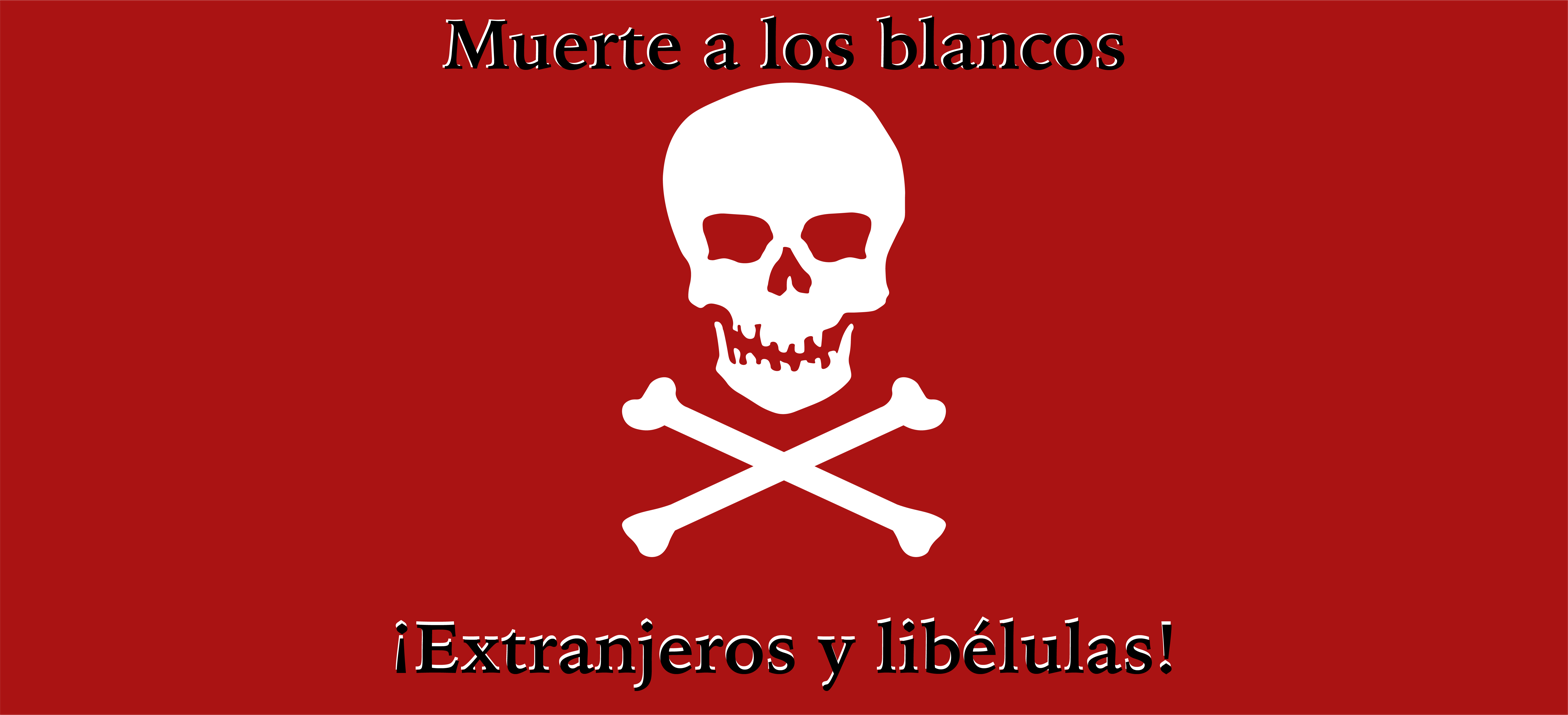
Digital reconstruction of Carrera's personal flag. The text translates to "Death to Whites, Foreigners and Liberals"

The battle began at 8:30 AM, when Allied troops initiated an attack at three different points, with an intense fire opened by both armies. The first Allied attack was repelled by the defenders of the foothill; during the second attack, the Allied troops were able to take the first line of trenches. They were subsequently expelled. During the third attack, the Allied force advanced to a point where it was impossible to distinguish between Guatemalan and Allied troops. Then, the fight became a melée, while the Guatemalan artillery severely punished the invaders. At the height of the battle when the Guatemalans faced an uncertain fate, Carrera ordered that sugar cane plantation around the meadow to be set on fire. The invading army was now surrounded: to the front, they faced the furious Guatemalan firepower, to the flanks, a huge blaze and to the rear, the river, all of which made retreat very difficult. The central division of the Allied force panicked and started a disorderly retreat. Soon, all of the Allied troops started retreating.

The 500 men of the rearguard pursued what was left of the Allied army, which desperately fled for the borders of their respective countries. The final count of the Allied losses were 528 dead, 200 prisoners, 1,000 rifles, 13,000 rounds of ammunition, many pack animals and baggage, 11 drums and seven artillery pieces. Vasconcelos sought refuge in El Salvador, while two Generals mounted on the same horse were seen crossing the Honduran border. Carrera regrouped his army and crossed the Salvadorean border, occupying Santa Ana, before he received orders from the Guatemalan President, Mariano Paredes, to return to Guatemala, since the Allies were requesting a cease-fire and a peace treaty.

=== Carrera Theater ===
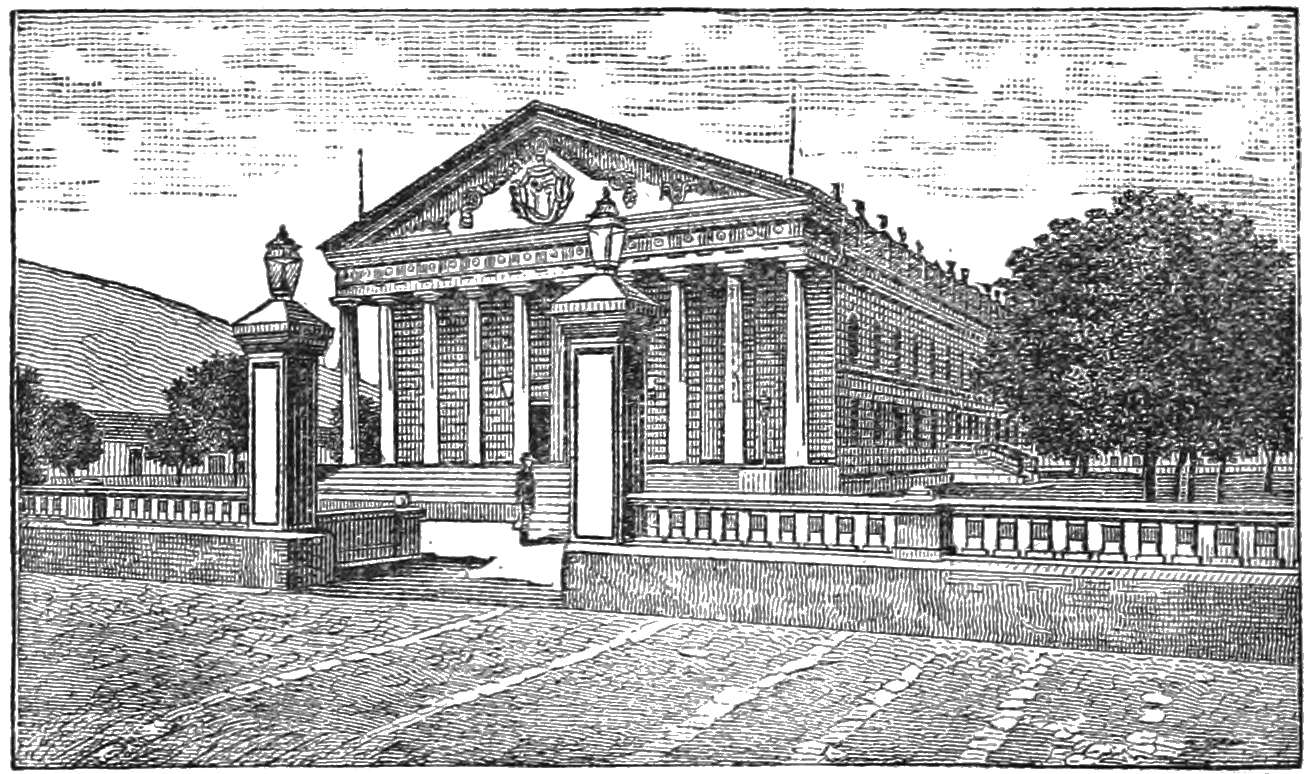
Carrera Theater

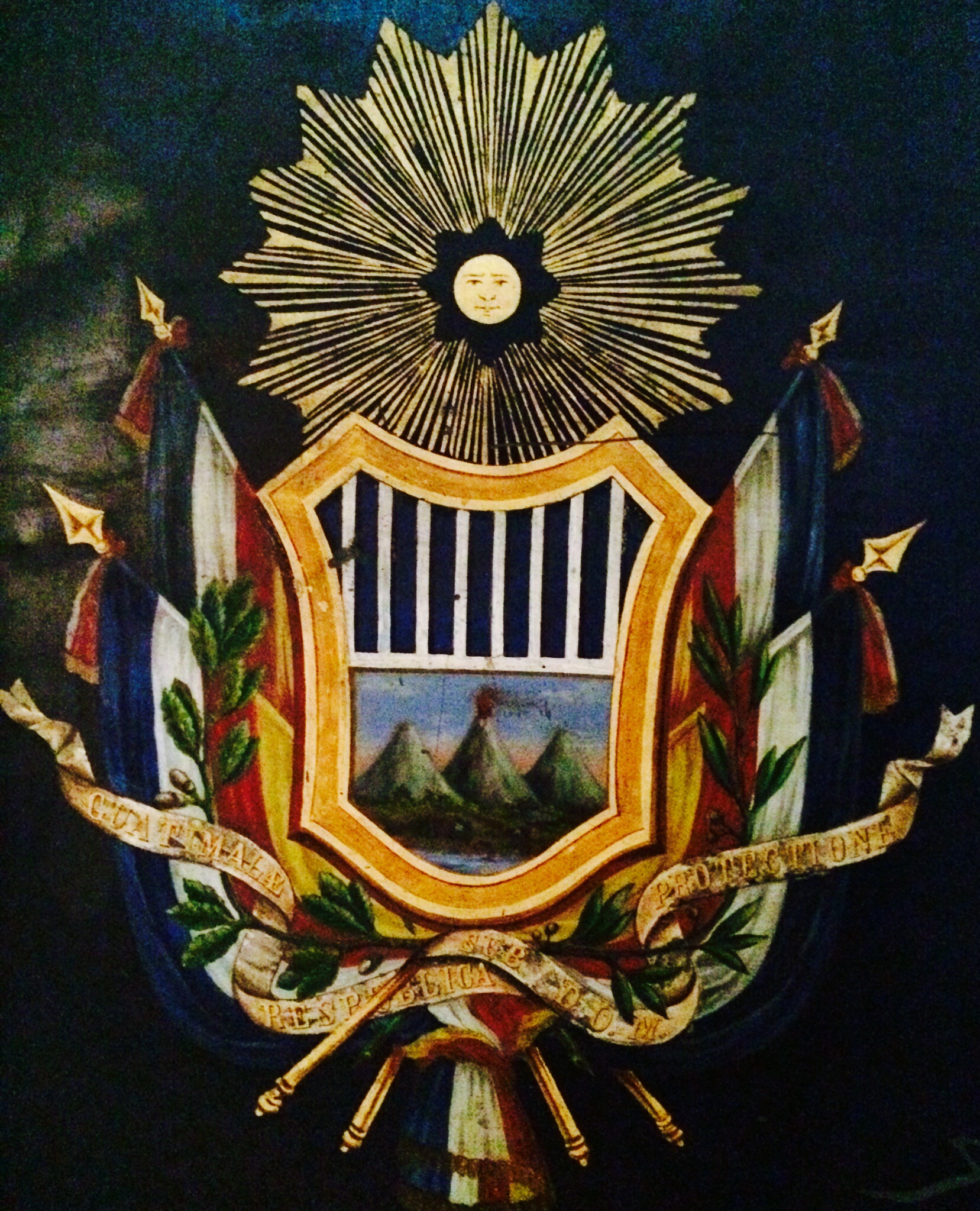
Coat of Arms of the Republic of Guatemala between 1858 and 1871. A replica was carved on the front side of the theater before it was remodeled in 1892.

An enthusiastic fan of opera, and following the advice of his mistress – Josefa Silva's (Note: Ms. Silva was a professional actress and singer who had taught Carrera how to behave, write, read and sing.)-, Carrera started the construction of a massive National Theater that was called «Carrera Theater» in his honor, and was located in the old Central Square. The Old Central Square was located to the northeast side of Guatemala City – then not larger than a village – and in 1776 was used to place the first block of the new Nueva Guatemala de la Asunción after the 1773 earthquakes destroy Santiago de los Caballeros de Guatemala. The place had been chosen as the new city Central Square, saving the surroundings for the new Cathedral, Palace and houses for the richest families of the time, the Aycinena family, given that the family leader, Fermín de Aycinena, contributed considerably to the move of the city from its old place. However, the design approved by the Spanish crown had the Central Square in a different location, and this one became the Old Central Square.

Years later it became a commercial site and on August 6, 1832, then State of Guatemala Governor, Dr. Mariano Gálvez, issued a decree to build a theater in the Old Central Square site. However, political climate was very tense in the country and when the civil war between liberal and conservative parties escalated, Gálvez was overthrown and the theater could not be built.

The project was revisited in 1852, when Juan Matheu and Manuel Francisco Pavón Aycinena presented Carrera with a new plan. Once approved, Carrera commissioned Matheu himself and Miguel Ruiz de Santisteban to build the theater. Initially it was in charge of engineer Miguel Rivera Maestre, but he quit after a few months and was replaced by German expert José Beckers, who built the Greek façades and added a lobby. This was the first monumental building ever built in the Republican era of Guatemala, a sign that in the 1850s the country was finally enjoying some peace and prosperity.

=== Concordat of 1854 ===
The Concordat of 1854 was an international treaty between Carrera and the Holy See, signed in 1852 and ratified by both parties in 1854. Through this, Guatemala gave the education of Guatemalan people to regular orders of the Catholic Church, committed to respect ecclesiastical property and monasteries, imposed mandatory tithing and allowed the bishops to censor what was published in the country; in return, Guatemala received dispensations for the members of the army, allowed those who had acquired the properties that the liberals had expropriated from the Church in 1829 to keep those properties, received the taxes generated by the properties of the Church, and had the right to judge certain crimes committed by clergy under Guatemalan law. The concordat was designed by Juan José de Aycinena y Piñol and not only reestablished but reinforced the relationship between Church and State in Guatemala. It was in force until the fall of the conservative government of Field Marshal Vicente Cerna y Cerna.

=== President for life ===
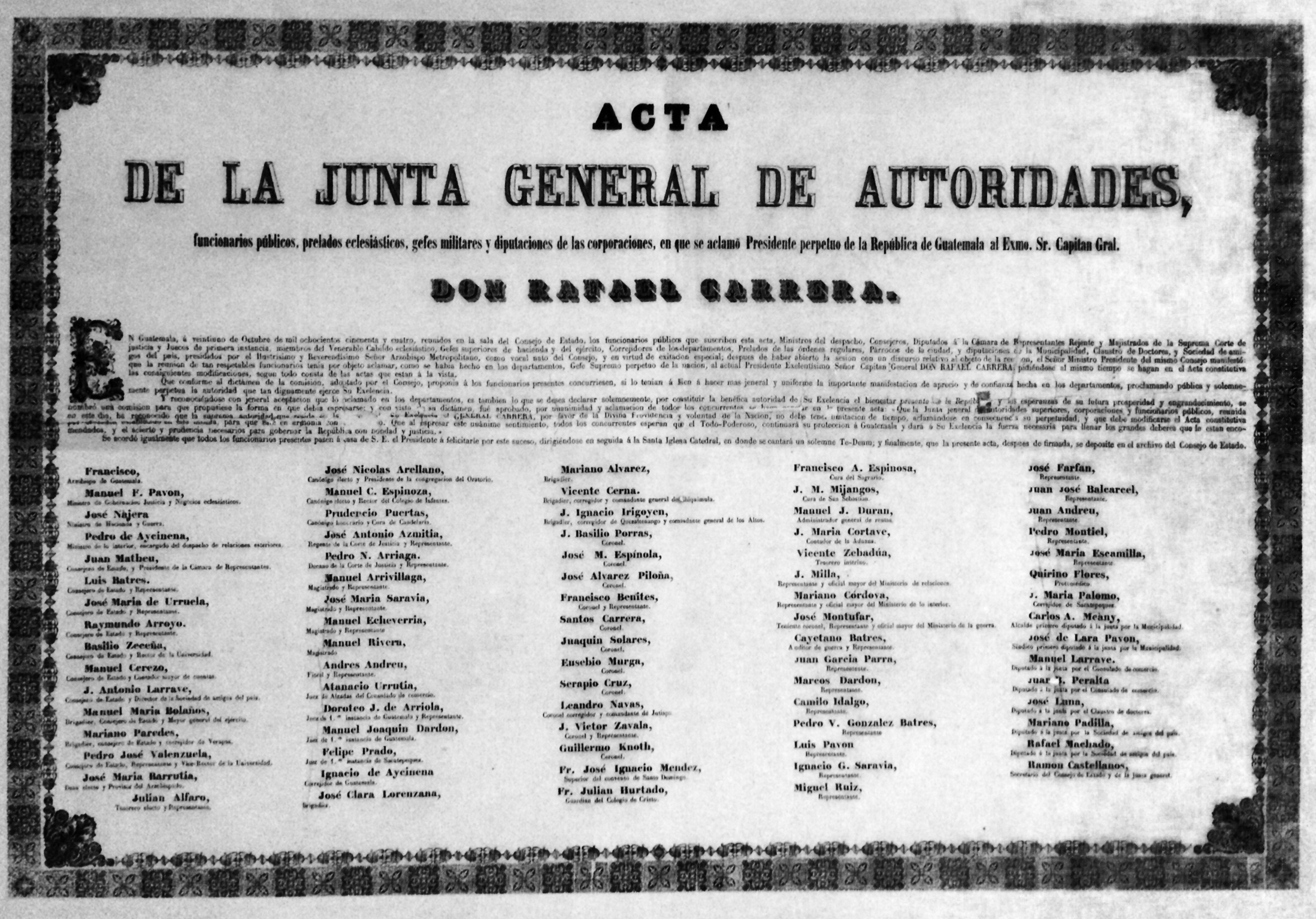
Copy of the decree by which Rafael Carrera was appointed president for Life of Guatemala in 1854.

In 1854, by anti-democratic initiative of Manuel Francisco Pavón Aycinena, Carrera was declared "supreme and perpetual leader of the nation" for life, with the power to choose his successor. He was in that position until he died on April 14, 1865. While he pursued some measures to set up a foundation for economic prosperity to please the conservative landowners, military challenges at home and in a three-year war with Honduras, El Salvador, and Nicaragua dominated his presidency. His rivalry with Gerardo Barrios, President of El Salvador, resulted in the War of 1863. At Coatepeque the Guatemalans suffered a severe defeat, which was followed by a truce. Honduras joined with El Salvador, and Nicaragua and Costa Rica with Guatemala. The contest was finally settled in favor of Carrera, who besieged and occupied San Salvador, and dominated Honduras and Nicaragua. He continued to act in concert with the Clerical Party, and tried to maintain friendly relations with the European governments. Before his death, Carrera nominated his friend and loyal soldier, Army Marshall Vicente Cerna y Cerna, as his successor.

=== Wyke-Aycinena treaty: Limits convention about Belize ===
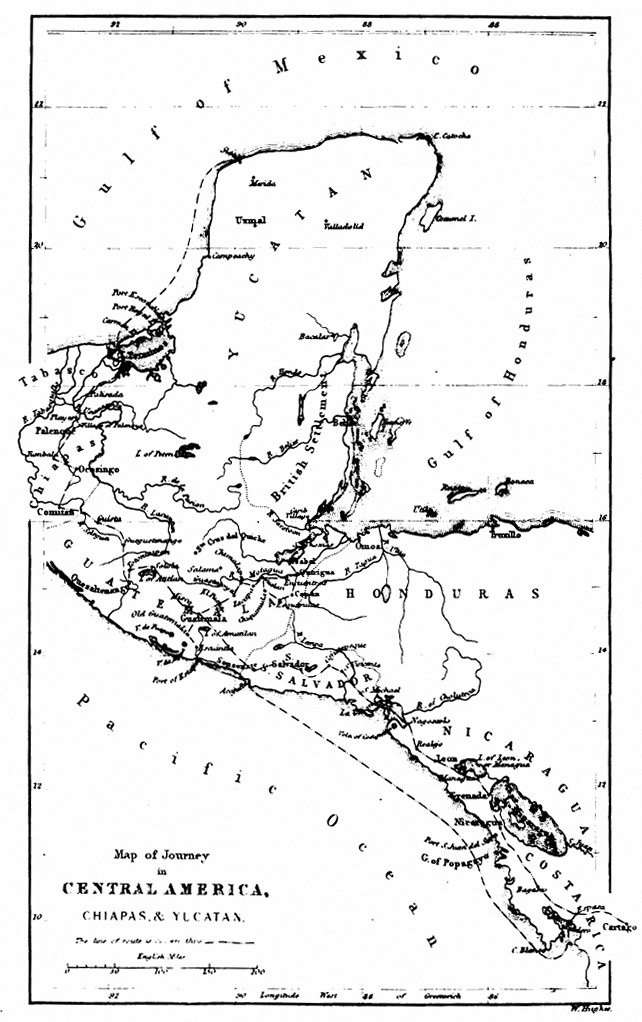
Map of Yucatán, Belize, Guatemala, Honduras and El Salvador region in 1839. Notice that the borders among Mexico, Guatemala and Belize were not defined at all.

The Belize region in the Yucatán Peninsula was long occupied by the Maya peoples but neglected by Spain and Guatemala, even though Spain made some exploratory expeditions in the 16th century that serve as her basis to claim the area as hers; Guatemala simply inherited that argument to claim the territory, even they never sent any expedition to the area after the Independence from Spain in 1821, due to the Central American civil war that ensued and lasted until 1860. On the other hand, slaves escaped from Caribbean island and pirates had set a small settlement there since middle of the 17th century, mainly as buccaneers quarters and then for fine wood production; the settlements were never recognized as British colonies, even though they were somewhat under the jurisdiction of the Jamaican British government. In the 18th century, Belize became the main smuggling center for Central America, even though the British accepted Spanish sovereignty over the region by means of treaties in 1783 and 1786, in exchange for a ceasefire and the authorization for the Britons to work with the precious woods from Belize.

After the Central America independence from Spain in 1821, Belize became the leading edge of the commercial entrance of Britain in the isthmus; British commercial brokers established themselves there and began prosper commercial routes with the Caribbean harbors of Guatemala, Honduras and Nicaragua.

When Carrera came to power in 1840, stopped the complaints over Belize, and established a Guatemalan consulate in the region to oversee the Guatemalan interests in that important commercial location. Belize commerce was booming in the region until 1855, when the Colombians built a transoceanic railway, which allowed commerce to flow more efficiently to the port at the Pacific; from then on, Belize commercial importance began a steep decline. When the Caste War of Yucatán began in the Yucatán Peninsula-native people raising that results in thousands of murdered European settlers- the Belize and Guatemala representatives were on high alert; Yucatán refugees fled into both Guatemala and Belize and even Belize superintendent came to fear that Carrera -given his strong alliance with Guatemalan natives- could be support the native risings in Central America. In the 1850s, the British showed their good will to settle the territorial differences with the Central American countries: they withdrew from the Mosquito Coast in Nicaragua and began talks that would end up in the restoration of the territory to Nicaragua in 1894: returned the Bay Islands to Honduras and even negotiated with the American filibuster William Walker in an effort to avoid the invasion of Honduras. They also signed a treaty about with Guatemala about Belize borders, which has been called by Guatemalans as the worst mistake made by the unelected regime of Rafael Carrera-.

Pedro de Aycinena y Piñol, as Foreign Secretary, had made an extra effort to keep good relations with the British crown. In 1859, William Walker's threat loomed again over Central America; in order to get the weapons needed to face the filibuster, Carrera's regime had to come to terms about Belize with the British Empire. On 30 April 1859, the Wyke-Aycinena treaty was signed, between the British and Guatemalan representatives. The controversial Wyke-Aycinena from 1859 had two parts:

- The first six articles clearly defined the Guatemala-Belize border: Guatemala acknowledged sovereignty of the United Kingdom over the Belize territory.
- The seventh article was about the construction of a road between Belize City and Guatemala City, which would be of mutual benefic, as Belize needed a way to communicate with the Pacific coast of Guatemala, having lost its commercial relevance after the construction of the transoceanic railroad in Panama in 1855; on the other hand, Guatemala needed a road to improve communication with its Atlantic coast. However, the road was never built; first because Guatemalan and Belizeans could not reach an agreement of the exact location for the road, and later because the conservatives lost power in Guatemala in 1871, and the liberal government declared the treaty void.

Among those who signed the treaty was José Milla y Vidaurre, who worked with Aycinena in the Foreign Ministry at the time. Rafael Carrera ratified the treaty on 1 May 1859, while Charles Lennox Wyke, British consul in Guatemala, travelled to Great Britain and got the royal approval on 26 September 1859. there were some protests coming from the American consul, Beverly Clarke, and some liberal representatives, but the issue was settled.

== Death ==
Rafael Carrera died in office April 14, 1865.

== Legacy ==
Carrera did not significantly enhance the life of rural Indians, but he delayed the destruction of their culture that characterized the liberals' capitalist developments. Carrera's regime established the foundations of all following government, including "economic control by unified elites, the military as the Latinos' means of social mobility, and even the alienation of Indian land and labor." His success was the result of his military brilliance, charisma, and his ability to quickly identify core issues and problems. His rule may have been arbitrary and severe, but not more so than that of other Latin American leaders.

Pope Pius IX awarded Carrera the Order of St. Gregory the Great in 1854. One year after his death, coins were issued in his honor with his face and the title: “Founder of the Republic of Guatemala.”

== See also ==
- Francisco Morazán
- History of Guatemala
- History of Central America
- Mariano Rivera Paz

== Notes and references ==
=== Further reading ===
- Adas, M.; Stearns; Schwarz, S.B. (2009). Turbulent Passage: A Global History of the Twentieth Century (4th ed.). Upper Saddle River, NJ: Pearson Education. ISBN 978-0205700325.
- Aycinena, Pedro de (1854). Concordato entre la Santa Sede y el presidente de la República de Guatemala (in Latin and Spanish). Guatemala: Imprenta La Paz.
- Calvert, Peter (1985). Guatemala: A Nation in Turmoil. Boulder, CO: Westview Press. ISBN 978-0865315723.
- Compagnie Belge de Colonisation (1844). Colonisation du district de Santo-Thomas de Guatemala par la Communauté de l'Union. Collection de renseignements publiés ou recueillis par la Compagnie (in French). Original held and digitised by the British Library.
- González Davison, Fernando (2008). La montaña infinita; Carrera, caudillo de Guatemala (in Spanish). Guatemala: Artemis y Edinter. ISBN 978-84-89452-81-7.
- Guateantaño (17 October 2011). "Parques y plazas antiguas de Guatemala". Guatepalabras Blogspot. Guatemala. Archived from the original on 27 January 2015.
- Hernández de León, Federico (1959). "El capítulo de las efemérides: José Milla y Rafael Carrera". Diario La Hora (in Spanish). Guatemala.
- — (1930). El libro de las efemérides (in Spanish). Vol. Tomo III. Guatemala: Tipografía Sánchez y de Guise.
- Marroquín Rojas, Clemente (1971). Francisco Morazán y Rafael Carrera (in Spanish). Guatemala: Piedrasanta.
- Martínez Peláez, Severo (1988). "Racismo y Análisis Histórico de la Definición del Indio Guatemalteco" (in Spanish). Guatemala: Universitaria.
- — (1990). La patria del criollo; ensayo de interpretación de la realidad colonial guatemalteca (in Spanish). México: Ediciones en Marcha.
- Miceli, Keith (1974). "Rafael Carrera: Defender and Promoter of Peasant Interests in Guatemala, 1837–1848". The Americas. 31 (1). Academy of American Franciscan History: 72–95. doi:10.1017/S000316150008843X. JSTOR 980382. S2CID 197669388.
- Minster, Christofer. Biography of Rafael Carrera Archived 2014-03-19 at the Wayback Machine.
- Montúfar, Lorenzo; Salazar, Ramón A. (1892). El centenario del general Francisco Morazán (in Spanish). Guatemala: Tipografía Nacional.
- Rosa, Ramón (1974). Historia del Benemérito Gral. Don Francisco Morazán, ex Presidente de la República de Centroamérica (in Spanish). Tegucigalpa: Ministerio de Educación Pública, Ediciones Técnicas Centroamericana.
- Rugeley, Terry (1996). Yucatan's Maya Peasantry and the Origins of the Caste War. San Antonio, TX: University of Texas. ISBN 978-0-292-77078-2.
- — (2001). Maya Wars: Ethnographic Accounts from Nineteenth Century Yucatan. Norman: University of Oklahoma Press. ISBN 978-0806133553.
- Stephens, John Lloyd; Catherwood, Frederick (1854). Incidents of travel in Central America, Chiapas, and Yucatan. London, England: Arthur Hall, Virtue and Co.
- Taracena, Arturo (1999). Invención criolla, sueño ladino, pesadilla indigena, Los Altos de Guatemala: de región a Estado, 1740-1871 (in Spanish). Guatemala: CIRMA. Archived from the original on 2016-01-09.
- Visoni-Alonzo, G. The Carrera Revolt and "Hybrid Warfare" in Nineteenth Century Central America. London: Palgrave Macmillan, 2017. ISBN 978-3319583402
- Visoni-Alonzo, G.,"Hybrid Warfare: The 1837 Revolt of Rafael Carrera in Guatemala" in G. Visoni-Alonzo & F. Jacob, eds. Latin America's Martial Age. Warfare and Conflict in the Long Nineteenth Century. Würzburg: Königshausen & Neumann, 2017.
- Weaver, Frederic S. (March 1999). "Reform and (Counter) Revolution in Post-Independence Guatemala: Liberalism, Conservatism, and Postmodern Controversies". Latin American Perspectives. 26 (2): 129–158. doi:10.1177/0094582x9902600207. JSTOR 2634298. S2CID 143757705.
- Woodward, Ralph Lee (1993). Rafael Carrera and the Emergence of the Republic of Guatemala, 1821–1871. Athens, GA: University of Georgia Press. ISBN 978-0820314488.

Political offices
Preceded by Mariano Rivera Paz	Guatemala State Governor; 1844–1848	Succeeded by Juan Antonio Martínez
Preceded by Mariano Paredes	President of Guatemala; 1851–1865	Succeeded by Pedro de Aycinena
